= List of nycterids =

Species in mammal family Nycteridae

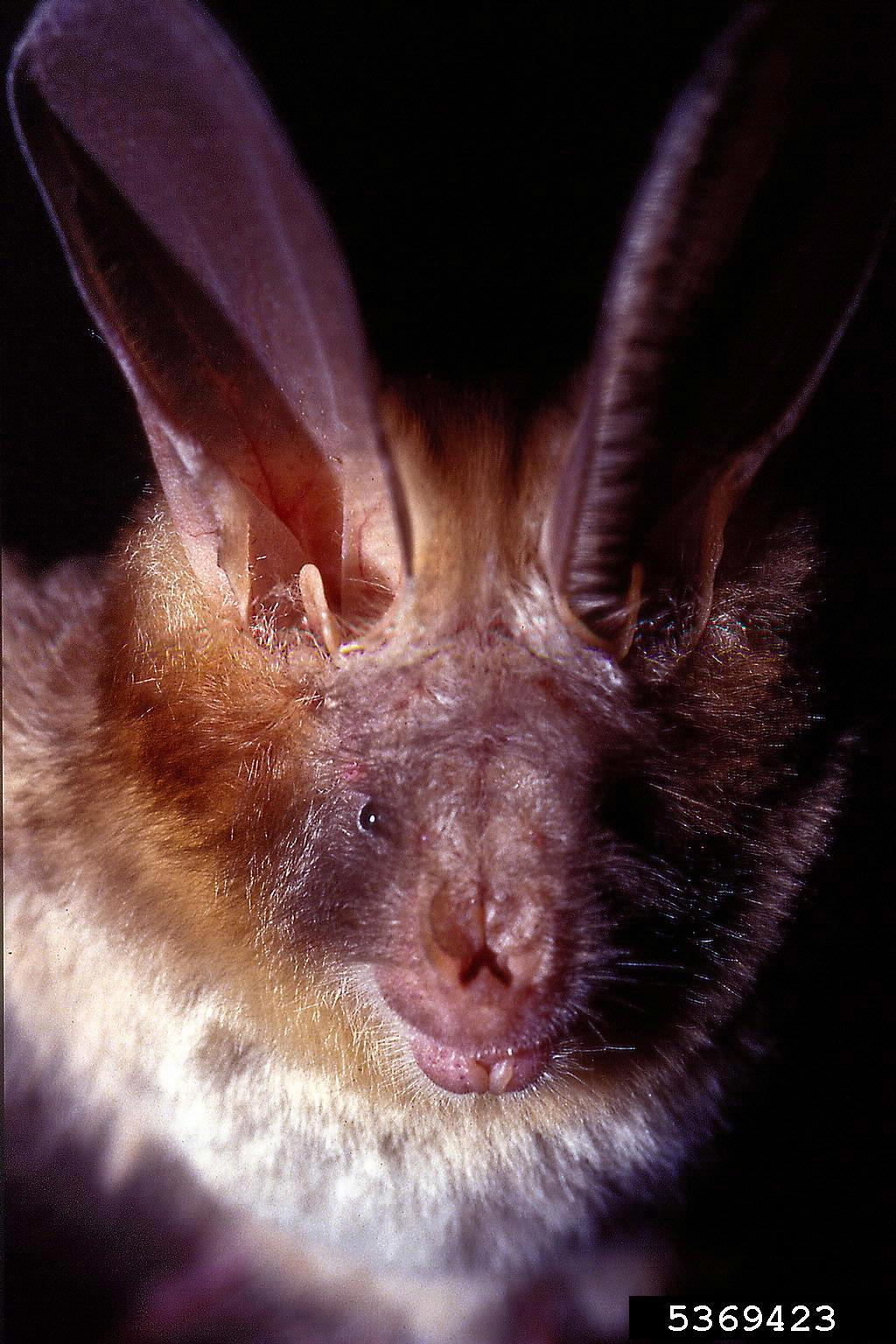
Egyptian slit-faced bat (Nycteris thebaica)

Nycteridae is one of the twenty families of bats in the mammalian order Chiroptera and part of the microbat suborder. Members of this family are called nycterids or slit-faced bats. They are found in Africa, the Arabian Peninsula, and southeastern Asia, primarily in forests and savannas, though some species can also be found in deserts, shrublands, grasslands, or caves. They range in size from the dwarf slit-faced bat, at 3 cm (1 in) plus a 3 cm (1 in) tail, to the large slit-faced bat, at 9 cm (4 in) plus a 9 cm (4 in) tail. Like all bats, nycterids are capable of true and sustained flight, and have forearm lengths ranging from 3 cm (1 in) to 7 cm (3 in). They are all insectivorous and eat a variety of insects and spiders, and the large slit-faced bat also regularly eats fish, frogs, birds, and bats. No nycterids have population estimates or are categorized as endangered species.

The 14 extant species of Nycteridae are all contained in a single genus, Nycteris. A few extinct prehistoric nycterid species have been discovered, though due to ongoing research and discoveries the exact number and categorization is not fixed.

== Conventions ==
IUCN Red List categories
Conservation status
- EX: Extinct (0 species)
- EW: Extinct in the wild (0 species)
- CR: Critically endangered (0 species)
- EN: Endangered (0 species)
- VU: Vulnerable (1 species)
- NT: Near threatened (1 species)
- LC: Least concern (10 species)

Other categories
- DD: Data deficient (2 species)
- NE: Not evaluated (0 species)

The author citation for the species or genus is given after the scientific name; parentheses around the author citation indicate that this was not the original taxonomic placement. Conservation status codes listed follow the International Union for Conservation of Nature (IUCN) Red List of Threatened Species. Range maps are provided wherever possible; if a range map is not available, a description of the nycterid's range is provided. Ranges are based on the IUCN Red List for that species unless otherwise noted.

== Classification ==
The family Nycteridae consists of fourteen extant species in a single genus, Nycteris.

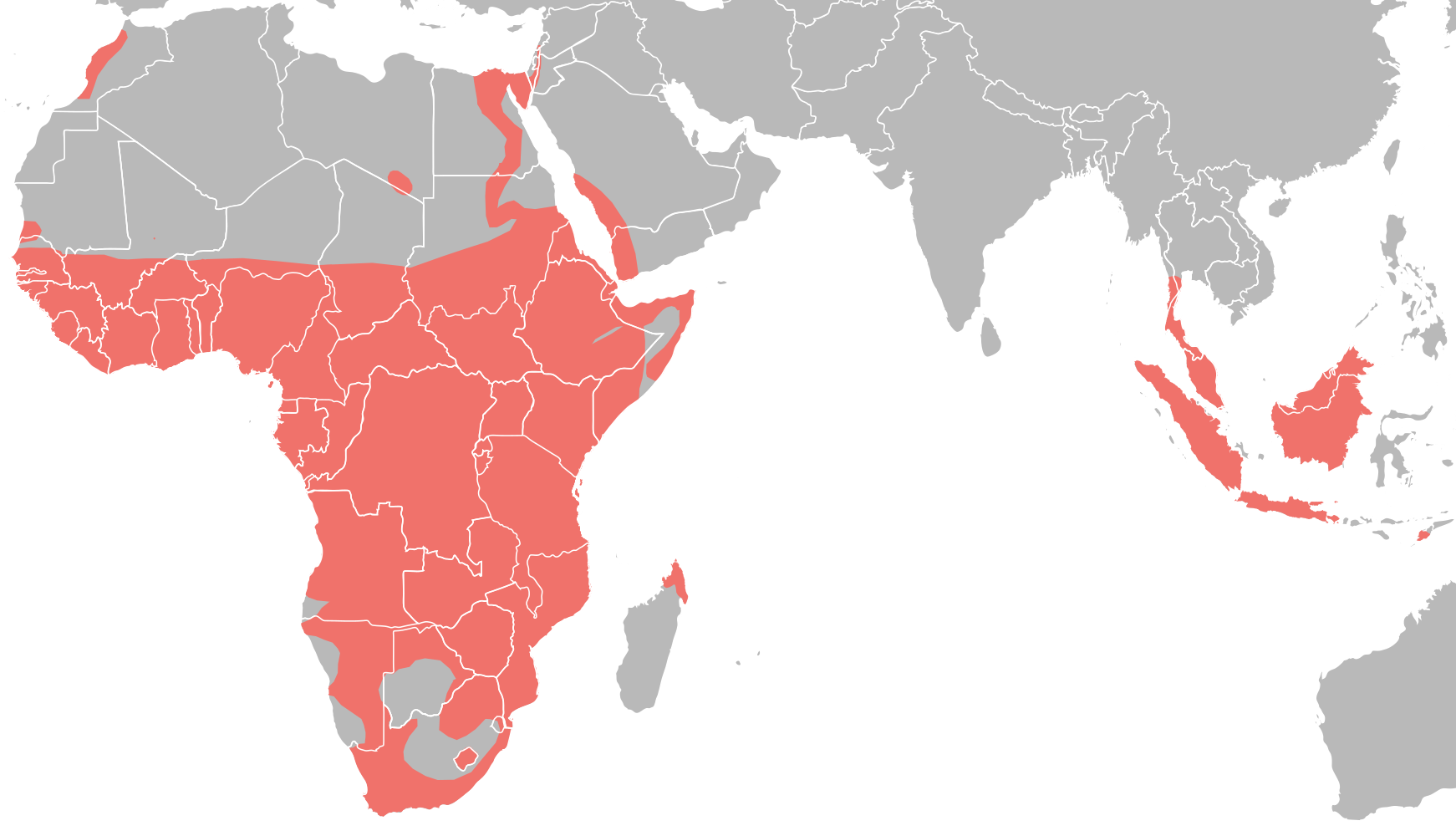
Nycteridae distribution

== Nycterids ==
The following classification is based on the taxonomy described by the reference work Mammal Species of the World (2005), with augmentation by generally accepted proposals made since using molecular phylogenetic analysis, as supported by both the IUCN SSC Bat Specialist Group and the American Society of Mammalogists.

Genus Nycteris – Geoffroy & Cuvier, 1795 – fourteen species
Common name	Scientific name and subspecies	Range	Size and ecology	IUCN status and estimated population
Andersen's slit-faced bat	N. aurita K. Andersen, 1912	Eastern Africa	Size: 4–5 cm (2–2 in), plus 4–6 cm (2 in) tail 3–5 cm (1–2 in) forearm length Habitat: Savanna and desert	LC Unknown
Bates's slit-faced bat	N. arge Thomas, 1903	Central and western Africa	Size: 5–7 cm (2–3 in), plus 4–7 cm (2–3 in) tail 3–5 cm (1–2 in) forearm length Habitat: Forest and savanna	LC Unknown
Dwarf slit-faced bat	N. nana (K. Andersen, 1912)	Central and western Africa	Size: 3–5 cm (1–2 in), plus 3–5 cm (1–2 in) tail 3–4 cm (1–2 in) forearm length Habitat: Forest and savanna	LC Unknown
Egyptian slit-faced bat	N. thebaica Geoffroy, 1813 Eight subspecies: N. t. adana; N. t. angolensis; N. t. brockmani; N. t. capensis; N. t. damarensis; N. t. labiata; N. t. najdiya; N. t. thebaica	Africa and western Arabian Peninsula	Size: 4–6 cm (2 in), plus 4–7 cm (2–3 in) tail 3–6 cm (1–2 in) forearm length Habitat: Forest, savanna, shrubland, grassland, caves, and desert	LC Unknown
Gambian slit-faced bat	N. gambiensis K. Andersen, 1912	Western Africa	Size: 4–5 cm (2 in), plus 4–6 cm (2 in) tail 3–5 cm (1–2 in) forearm length Habitat: Forest, savanna, and caves	LC Unknown
Hairy slit-faced bat	N. hispida Schreber, 1775	Sub-Saharan Africa	Size: 4–5 cm (2 in), plus 4–6 cm (2 in) tail 3–5 cm (1–2 in) forearm length Habitat: Forest and savanna	LC Unknown
Intermediate slit-faced bat	N. intermedia Aellen, 1959	Central and western Africa	Size: 4–5 cm (2 in), plus 4–6 cm (2 in) tail 3–4 cm (1–2 in) forearm length Habitat: Forest and savanna	LC Unknown
Ja slit-faced bat	N. major K. Andersen, 1912	Central and western Africa	Size: 5–8 cm (2–3 in), plus 5–7 cm (2–3 in) tail 4–5 cm (2 in) forearm length Habitat: Forest and savanna	DD Unknown
Javan slit-faced bat	N. javanica E. Geoffroy Saint-Hilaire, 1813 Two subspecies: N. j. bastiani; N. j. javanica	Indonesia	Size: Unknown length 4–5 cm (2 in) forearm length Habitat: Forest and caves	VU Unknown
Large slit-faced bat	N. grandis Peters, 1865	Central, eastern, and western Africa	Size: 7–9 cm (3–4 in), plus 6–9 cm (2–4 in) tail 5–7 cm (2–3 in) forearm length Habitat: Savanna and forest	LC Unknown
Large-eared slit-faced bat	N. macrotis Dobson, 1876 Four subspecies: N. m. aethiopica; N. m. luteola; N. m. macrotis; N. m. oriana	Sub-Saharan Africa	Size: 4–7 cm (2–3 in), plus 4–7 cm (2–3 in) tail 4–6 cm (2 in) forearm length Habitat: Forest and savanna	LC Unknown
Malayan slit-faced bat	N. tragata K. Andersen, 1912	Southeastern Asia	Size: 6–8 cm (2–3 in), plus 7–8 cm (3 in) tail 4–6 cm (2 in) forearm length Habitat: Forest, rocky areas, and caves	NT Unknown
Parissi's slit-faced bat	N. parisii de Beaux, 1924 Two subspecies: N. p. benuensis; N. p. parisii	Eastern Africa	Size: 4–5 cm (2 in), plus 4–5 cm (2 in) tail 3–5 cm (1–2 in) forearm length Habitat: Savanna	DD Unknown
Wood's slit-faced bat	N. woodi K. Andersen, 1914 Two subspecies: N. w. sabiensis; N. w. woodi	Southern Africa	Size: 4–5 cm (2 in), plus 4–5 cm (2 in) tail 3–5 cm (1–2 in) forearm length Habitat: Savanna and caves	LC Unknown

== Sources ==
- Chernasky, Amy; Motis, Anna; Burgin, Connor, eds. (2023). All the Mammals of the World. Lynx Nature Books. ISBN 978-84-16728-66-4.
- Simmons, Nancy B. (2005). Wilson, Don E.; Reeder, DeeAnn M. (eds.). Mammal Species of the World. Vol. 1 (3rd ed.). Johns Hopkins University Press. ISBN 978-0-8018-8221-0.
- Nowak, Ronald M. (1994). Walker's Bats of the World. Johns Hopkins University Press. ISBN 978-0-8018-4986-2.
