= Arabian trident bat =

Conservation status
- Data Deficient (IUCN 3.1)

Scientific classification
- Kingdom: Animalia
- Phylum: Chordata
- Class: Mammalia
- Order: Chiroptera
- Family: Hipposideridae
- Genus: Asellia
- Species: A. arabica

Binomial name
- Asellia arabica Benda, Vallo, & Reiter, 2011
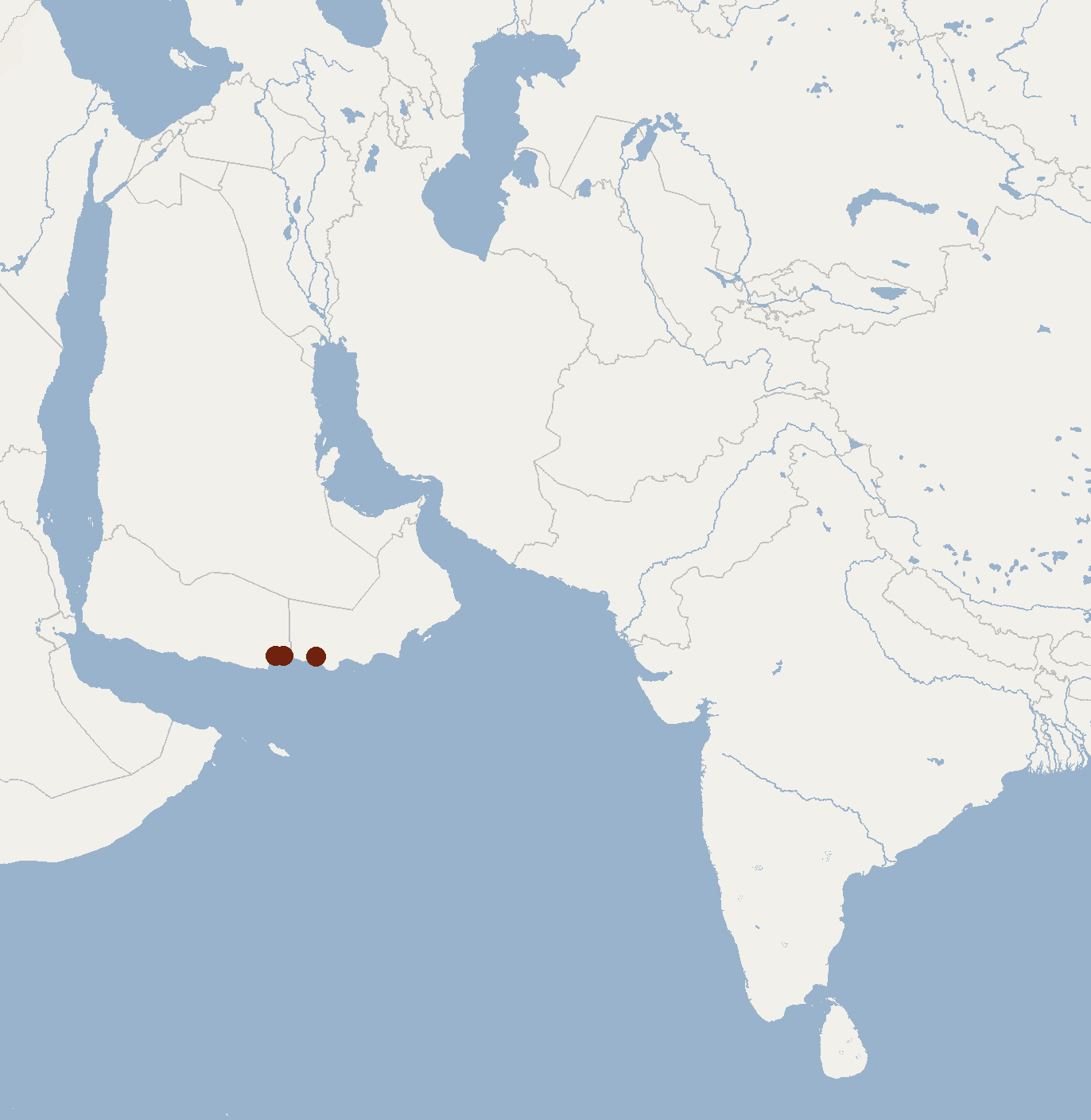
- Range map

Species of bat

The Arabian trident bat (Asellia arabica) is a species of Old World leaf-nosed bat found in the Middle East.

== Taxonomy and etymology ==
The Arabian trident bat was described as a new species in 2011. It was distinguished as a result of a taxonomic split in the trident bat, A. tridens. The holotype was collected in 2005 in the Al Mahrah Governorate of Yemen. Its species name "arabica" is derived from the Arabian Peninsula where it is found.

== Description ==
Its forearm length is approximately 46.5 mm (1.83 in). The fur of its back is beige or a pale, brownish-gray. The fur may have a yellowish or faint rusty tint. Its belly fur is paler than its back fur. Its flight membranes are also a pale, brownish-gray.

== Range and status ==
It is found in the Middle East, with documented occurrence in southwestern Oman and southeastern Yemen. As of 2017, it is evaluated as a data deficient species by the IUCN. There is no estimate of its population size.
