= Intermediate slit-faced bat =

Conservation status
- Least Concern (IUCN 3.1)

Scientific classification
- Domain: Eukaryota
- Kingdom: Animalia
- Phylum: Chordata
- Class: Mammalia
- Order: Chiroptera
- Family: Nycteridae
- Genus: Nycteris
- Species: N. intermedia

Binomial name
- Nycteris intermedia Aellen, 1959

Species of bat

The intermediate slit-faced bat (Nycteris intermedia) is a species of slit-faced bat living in forest and savanna regions of west and central Africa. It is easily confused with Nycteris arge and Nycteris nana. It is broadly distributed, but is classified as near-threatened because of the threat of predicted habitat loss. It is much more restricted to true rainforest than is N. arge.
