= List of animals of Malaysia =

This is a list of animals found in Malaysia. Malaysia is a humid country, with rainforests hosting a wide array of animal species. There are around 361 mammal species, 250 reptile species, and 150 frog species found in Malaysia. Approximately 677 bird species are found on Peninsular Malaysia alone (and 694 for Malaysia). Malaysia's marine territory also holds a great diversity of life, with the country's waters being part of the Coral Triangle.

== Fauna ==
=== Reptiles ===
- Asian forest tortoise
- Bengal monitor
- Blood python
- Cantor's giant softshell turtle
- Sharp-nosed viper
- False gharial
- Green sea turtle
- Hawksbill turtle
- Elongated tortoise
- Leatherback sea turtle
- Chinese mountain pit viper
- Three horned-scaled pit viper
- Reticulated python
- Saltwater crocodile
- Siamese crocodile
- Water monitor

=== Mammals ===
- Malayan tiger
- Leopard
- Elephant
- Panther
- Sun bear
- Sumatran serow
- Long-tailed giant rat
- Malayan roundleaf bat
- Large flying fox

== See also ==
- Wildlife of Malaysia
