= Patrizi's trident leaf-nosed bat =

Conservation status
- Least Concern (IUCN 3.1)

Scientific classification
- Kingdom: Animalia
- Phylum: Chordata
- Class: Mammalia
- Infraclass: Placentalia
- Order: Chiroptera
- Family: Hipposideridae
- Genus: Asellia
- Species: A. patrizii

Binomial name
- Asellia patrizii de Beaux, 1931
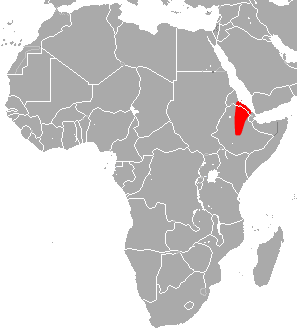
- Patrizi's trident leaf-nosed bat range

Species of bat

The Patrizi's trident leaf-nosed bat (Asellia patrizii) is a species of bat in the family Hipposideridae. It is found in Eritrea, Ethiopia, and Saudi Arabia. Its natural habitats are subtropical or tropical dry shrubland and caves.
