= Yellow-faced horseshoe bat =

Conservation status
- Least Concern (IUCN 3.1)

Scientific classification
- Kingdom: Animalia
- Phylum: Chordata
- Class: Mammalia
- Order: Chiroptera
- Family: Rhinolophidae
- Genus: Rhinolophus
- Species: R. virgo

Binomial name
- Rhinolophus virgo K. Andersen, 1905
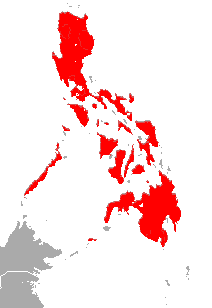
- Yellow-faced horseshoe bat range

Species of bat

The yellow-faced horseshoe bat (Rhinolophus virgo) is a species of bat in the family Rhinolophidae. It is endemic to the Philippines.
