= Andersen's slit-faced bat =

Conservation status
- Least Concern (IUCN 3.1)

Scientific classification
- Kingdom: Animalia
- Phylum: Chordata
- Class: Mammalia
- Order: Chiroptera
- Family: Nycteridae
- Genus: Nycteris
- Species: N. aurita

Binomial name
- Nycteris aurita K. Andersen, 1912

Synonyms
- Petalia aurita K. Andersen, 1912

Species of bat

Andersen's slit-faced bat (Nycteris aurita) is a slit-faced bat species found in East Africa. It has been recorded in Somaliland, through South Sudan and Ethiopia, into Kenya and Tanzania. No information is available on the population size of this species, which inhabits savanna habitats and semidesert.

== Taxonomy and etymology ==
It was described as a new species in 1912 by Danish mammalogist Knud Andersen. Andersen placed it in the now-defunct genus Petalia, with a binomial of Petalia aurita. Since at least 1939, however, it has been included in the genus Nycteris. Its species name "aurita" is from Latin "auritus", meaning "having long ears". Andersen wrote that it was similar in appearance to the hairy slit-faced bat with the exception of its "much longer" ears. Still, it is often considered as a synonym or subspecies of the hairy slit-faced bat.

== Range and status ==
Its range includes several countries in East Africa, including Ethiopia, Kenya, Somaliland, Sudan, Tanzania, Uganda, and Zambia. It is documented in association with savanna habitats, though it has also been found in semi-arid climates.

In 2017, it was evaluated as a least-concern species by the IUCN.
