= Malagasy slit-faced bat =

Conservation status
- Data Deficient (IUCN 3.1)

Scientific classification
- Kingdom: Animalia
- Phylum: Chordata
- Class: Mammalia
- Order: Chiroptera
- Family: Nycteridae
- Genus: Nycteris
- Species: N. madagascariensis

Binomial name
- Nycteris madagascariensis Grandidier, 1937
- Malagasy slit-faced bat range

Species of bat

The Malagasy slit-faced bat (Nycteris madagascariensis) is a species of slit-faced bat native to Madagascar. Very little is known about the species.
