= Small rufous horseshoe bat =

Conservation status
- Data Deficient (IUCN 3.1)

Scientific classification
- Kingdom: Animalia
- Phylum: Chordata
- Class: Mammalia
- Order: Chiroptera
- Family: Rhinolophidae
- Genus: Rhinolophus
- Species: R. subrufus

Binomial name
- Rhinolophus subrufus K. Andersen, 1905
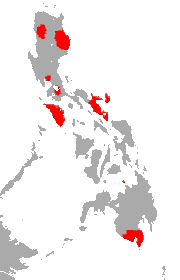
- Small rufous horseshoe bat range

Species of bat

The small rufous horseshoe bat (Rhinolophus subrufus) is a species of bat in the family Rhinolophidae. It is endemic to the Philippines on the island of Camiguin, Catanduanes, Luzon, Mindanao and Mindoro at elevations from sea level to 1,000m.
