= Philippine forest horseshoe bat =

Conservation status
- Least Concern (IUCN 3.1)

Scientific classification
- Kingdom: Animalia
- Phylum: Chordata
- Class: Mammalia
- Order: Chiroptera
- Family: Rhinolophidae
- Genus: Rhinolophus
- Species: R. inops

Binomial name
- Rhinolophus inops K. Andersen, 1905
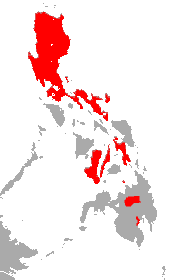
- Philippine forest horseshoe bat range

Species of bat

The Philippine forest horseshoe bat (Rhinolophus inops) is a species of bat in the family Rhinolophidae. It is endemic to the Philippines.
