= Neriad horseshoe bat =

Conservation status
- Data Deficient (IUCN 3.1)

Scientific classification
- Kingdom: Animalia
- Phylum: Chordata
- Class: Mammalia
- Order: Chiroptera
- Family: Rhinolophidae
- Genus: Rhinolophus
- Species: R. nereis

Binomial name
- Rhinolophus nereis K. Andersen, 1905
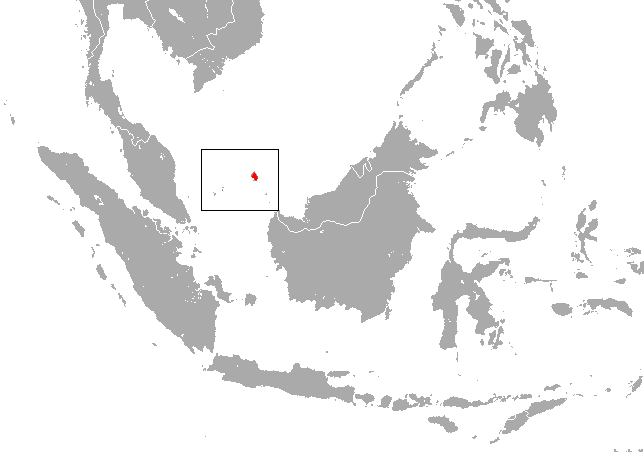
- Neriad horseshoe bat range

Species of bat

The neriad horseshoe bat (Rhinolophus nereis) is a species of bat in the family Rhinolophidae.

It is endemic to Siantan Island of the Anambas Islands, and to the North Natuna Islands, west of Borneo in the South China Sea within Indonesia. Nothing is known about the ecology or total population size of the species.
