= Lesser tube-nosed bat =

Conservation status
- Vulnerable (IUCN 3.1)

Scientific classification
- Kingdom: Animalia
- Phylum: Chordata
- Class: Mammalia
- Order: Chiroptera
- Family: Pteropodidae
- Genus: Nyctimene
- Species: N. minutus

Binomial name
- Nyctimene minutus K. Andersen, 1910
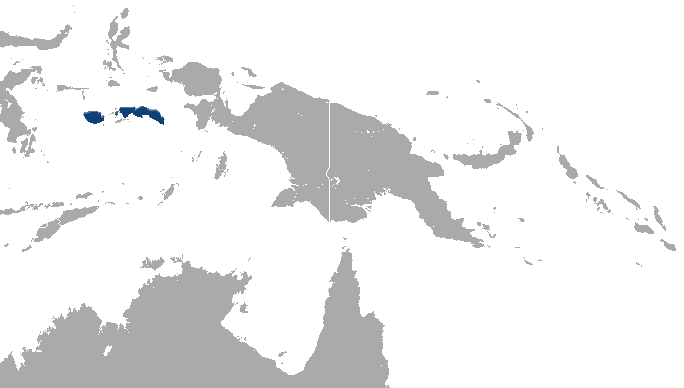
- Lesser tube-nosed bat range

Synonyms
- Nyctimene varius

Species of bat

The lesser tube-nosed bat (Nyctimene minutus) is a species of megabat in the family Pteropodidae. It is native to two of the Maluku Islands (Spice Islands) in northern Indonesia.

== Taxonomy ==
The lesser tube-nosed bat was described as a new species in 1910 by Danish mammalogist Knud Andersen. The holotype had been collected by Alfred Russel Wallace in Tondano, Indonesia. Two subspecies are recognized, with Andersen also the taxonomic authority: N. m. minutus and N. m. varius.

== Description ==
The lesser tube-nosed bat has a forearm length of approximately 51 mm (2.0 in).

== Range and status ==
The bat is endemic to the mountainous forests of Buru and Seram Islands in Maluku Province. It is not found on nearby Ambon Island. It has been documented at a range of elevations from 700–900 m (2,300–3,000 ft) above sea level. Its habitat is mid-montane forests.

In 2008, it was evaluated as a vulnerable species by the IUCN.
