= Vinson's slit-faced bat =

Conservation status
- Data Deficient (IUCN 3.1)

Scientific classification
- Kingdom: Animalia
- Phylum: Chordata
- Class: Mammalia
- Order: Chiroptera
- Family: Nycteridae
- Genus: Nycteris
- Species: N. vinsoni

Binomial name
- Nycteris vinsoni Dalquest, 1965

Species of bat

Vinson's slit-faced bat (Nycteris vinsoni) is a species of slit-faced bat known only from two specimens. Both specimens were smoked out of a baobab tree in a national park in southern Mozambique. Virtually nothing is known about this species.

N. vinsoni was once considered a synonym of Nycteris macrotis, but it became recognized as a separate species in 2004. Some, however, still consider N. vinsoni to be a subspecies of N. macrotis. Others believe the correct name for the species should be N. aethiopica.
