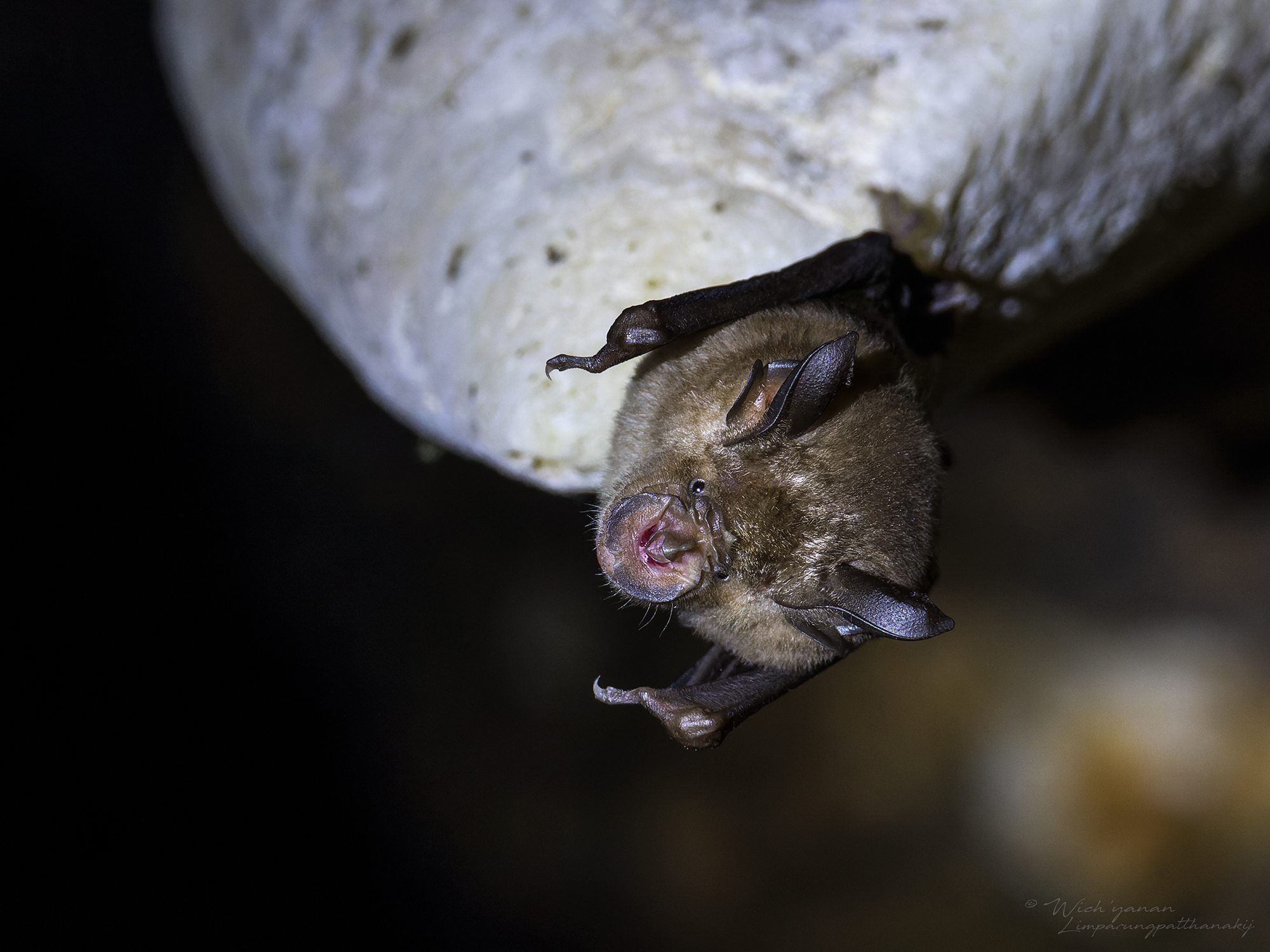

Conservation status
- Least Concern (IUCN 3.1)

Scientific classification
- Kingdom: Animalia
- Phylum: Chordata
- Class: Mammalia
- Order: Chiroptera
- Family: Rhinolophidae
- Genus: Rhinolophus
- Species: R. thomasi

Binomial name
- Rhinolophus thomasi K. Andersen, 1905
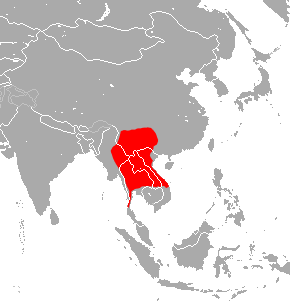
- Thomas's horseshoe bat range

= Thomas's horseshoe bat =

Species of bat

Thomas's horseshoe bat (Rhinolophus thomasi) is a species of bat in the family Rhinolophidae. It is found in China, Laos, Myanmar, Thailand, and Vietnam.
