= Oscar de Beaux =

Italian naturalist

- Born: 5 December 1879; Florence
- Died: 29 September 1955 (aged 75); Torre Pellice
- Citizenship: Italy
- Scientific career
- Fields: Mammalogy
- Institutions: Tierpark Hagenbeck; University of Genoa; Museo Civico di Storia Naturale di Genova

Oscar de Beaux (5 December 1879 – 29 September 1955) was an Italian mammalogist. His studies of mammals primarily concerned the Italian colonies of Africa. De Beaux was also a conservationist, authoring one of the first papers to argue the ethics of conservation, "Biological ethics: an attempt to arouse a naturalistic conscience".

== Early life ==
De Beaux was born 5 December 1879 in Florence, Italy.

== Career ==
=== Zoology ===
From 1911–1913, he was a scientific assistant at the Carl Hagenbeck zoo. He was later employed at the University of Genoa as a professor of zoology. Next, he worked at the Museo Civico di Storia Naturale di Genova (Genoa Natural History Museum), where he served as Director from 1934–1947. While at the Museum he managed a small zoo so as to make scientific observations on living mammals. Drawing from this work, he published one of the first scientific papers on the possible effects of captivity on the skeleton and fur color of animals. He also undertook several hybridization experiments at the zoo, including a blackbuck × Dorcas gazelle cross, as well as among varieties of leopards or jackals.

De Beaux undertook several studies of mammals of the Italian colonies of Africa. He described a number of new mammal species and subspecies, including Patrizi's trident leaf-nosed bat, the Somalian trident bat, and Parissi's slit-faced bat.

=== Conservation ===
In 1923, de Beaux joined the International Society for the Conservation of the European bison. This organization was the world's first to attempt to save an animal species from extinction by means of captive breeding. In 1930, de Beaux published "Biological ethics: an attempt to arouse a naturalistic conscience", which Pedrotti called "his most important study." In it, de Beaux defined biological ethics as the "study and definition of man's moral position before the living beings which do not belong to the human race, beginning with the moral premise that man was not able to create the species." "Biological ethics" has been called "one of the first works on the ethical aspects of conservation".

De Beaux made ethical arguments in several other publications. In one paper on the European bison, he argued that "man is not in the world to destroy or exploit nature, but to preserve it and increase its value". In another publication advocating for the conservation of brown bears in Trentino, he stated that living organisms are inimitable by man; while man can discover and destroy nature, he cannot create it. Pedrotti stated that de Beaux's biological ethic could be summed up as "take care that no animal or plant species disappears from the face of the earth, that is, respect every expression of life, which encloses within itself its own solution to the immense problem of existence".

De Beaux also emphasized the role of education in conservation, highlighting the importance of facilities such as zoos, aquaria, natural history museums, and botanical gardens. He stated that they "promote not only naturalist knowledge, but also love and a sympathetic attitude for plants and animals".

American conservationist Aldo Leopold began a correspondence with de Beaux in 1934 after reading an English translation of "Biological ethics", saying that he read the paper "with very intense interest". In his letter, Leopold enclosed his own publication in a similar vein, "The Conservation Ethic". De Beaux's conservation publication actually predated Leopold's by several years, as the English translation was not published until 1932, which was around when Leopold wrote "The Conservation Ethic".

== Death ==
De Beaux died on 29 September 1955 in Torre Pellice, Italy.
