= Knud Andersen (mammalogist) =

Danish mammalogist

- Born: April 29, 1867; Frederiksberg, Denmark
- Disappeared: June 1918 (age 51); England
- Occupation: Zoologist
- Known for: Bat research

Knud Christian Andersen (29 April 1867 in Frederiksberg – last seen alive June 1918 in England) was a Danish zoologist. His research focused on bats.

== Life and work ==
Towards the end of the 19th century, Andersen first worked as an ornithologist and ran field studies on the Faroe Islands. In 1901 Ferdinand I awarded him an appointment at the Zoological Museum of Sofia. Due to his frustration with the working conditions, he gave up this position. In 1904, he was hired by the British Museum to research bats in the Pacific, in South-East Asia and in Queensland. He was especially interested in the genus flying fox and Horseshoe bats, of which he described 15 new species. He published 13 scientific papers on the South-East Asian Horseshoe bats. His most famous work was his Catalogue of the Chiroptera in the Collection of the British Museum, which is considered one of the most extensive works on flying foxes. Andersen was elected fellow of the Zoological Society of London (ZSL) in 1909.

In June 1918 he mysteriously disappeared; his body has never been found. His colleague Oldfield Thomas submitted his final manuscript on his behalf and stated that Andersen expected "to be absent from his scientific work for some time."

== Dedicated taxa ==
Rhinolophus anderseni (1909 by Ángel Cabrera); no longer a valid taxon. The subspecies anderseni and aequalis are today considered synonyms of the species Rhinolophus arcuatus and Rhinolophus acuminatus). Dobsonia anderseni (1914 by Oldfield Thomas), Artibeus anderseni (1916 by Wilfred Hudson Osgood).

== See also ==
- List of people who disappeared mysteriously (pre-1910)

== Selected publications ==
- Meddelelser om faeroernes Fugle med saerligt Hensyn til Nolsø, efter skriftlige Oplysninger (with P.F. Petersen), 1894
- Diomedea melanophrys, boende paa Færøerne, 1894 (English: Diomedea melanophrys in the Faröe Islands, 1895)
- Sysselmand H.C. Müller’s haandskrevne optegnelser om Færøoerne Fugle (with Hans Christopher Müller), 1901
- Knud Andersen (1909). "Notes on the Genus Acerodon, with a Synopsis of its Species and Subspecies, and Descriptions of Four new Forms". Annals and Magazine of Natural History. 3: 20–29. doi:10.1080/00222930908692540. ISSN 0374-5481. Wikidata Q115707434.
- Catalogue of the Chiroptera in the collection of the British Museum, Volume 1, Megachiroptera. Vol. 1 (2nd ed.). British Museum (Natural History), London. 1912.
- On the determination of age in bats, 1917

== Species described by Knud Andersen ==
- Acerodon humilis K. Andersen 1909
- Dobsonia praedatrix K. Andersen 1909
- Dobsonia inermis K. Andersen 1909
- Dobsonia exoleta K. Andersen 1909
- Eonycteris major K. Andersen 1910
- Pteropus cognatus K. Andersen 1908
- Pteropus intermedius K. Andersen 1908
- Pteropus lylei K. Andersen 1908
- Pteropus speciosus K. Andersen 1908
- Pteropus pelewensis K. Andersen 1908
- Pteropus pilosus K. Andersen 1908
- Pteropus yapensis K. Andersen 1908
- Rousettus celebensis K. Andersen 1907
- Macroglossus sobrinus K. Andersen 1911
- Nyctimene minutus K. Andersen 1910
- Nyctimene cyclotis K. Andersen 1910
- Nyctimene certans K. Andersen 1912
- Pteralopex anceps K. Andersen 1909
- Rhinolophus nereis K. Andersen 1905
- Rhinolophus monoceros K. Andersen 1905
- Rhinolophus madurensis K. Andersen 1918
- Rhinolophus simulator K. Andersen 1904
- Rhinolophus virgo K. Andersen 1905
- Rhinolophus thomasi K. Andersen 1905
- Rhinolophus subrufus K. Andersen 1905
- Rhinolophus sinicus K. Andersen 1905
- Rhinolophus robinsoni K. Andersen 1918
- Rhinolophus shortridgei K. Andersen 1918
- Rhinolophus sedulus K. Andersen 1905
- Rhinolophus stheno K. Andersen 1905
- Rhinolophus inops K. Andersen 1905
- Rhinolophus celebensis K. Andersen 1905
- Rhinolophus cognatus K. Andersen 1906
- Rhinolophus eloquens K. Andersen 1905
- Rhinolophus darlingi K. Andersen 1905
- Hipposideros nequam K. Andersen 1918
- Hipposideros pomona K. Andersen 1918
- Hipposideros beatus K. Andersen 1906
- Hipposideros dinops K. Andersen 1905
- Artibeus aztecus K. Andersen 1906
- Artibeus hirsutus K. Andersen 1906
- Nycteris aurita (K. Andersen 1912)
- Nycteris gambiensis (K. Andersen 1912)
- Nycteris major (K. Andersen 1912)
- Nycteris nana (K. Andersen 1912)
- Nycteris tragata (K. Andersen 1912)
- Nycteris woodi K. Andersen 1914
- Mormopterus doriae K. Andersen 1907
- Dobsonia crenulata K. Andersen 1909
