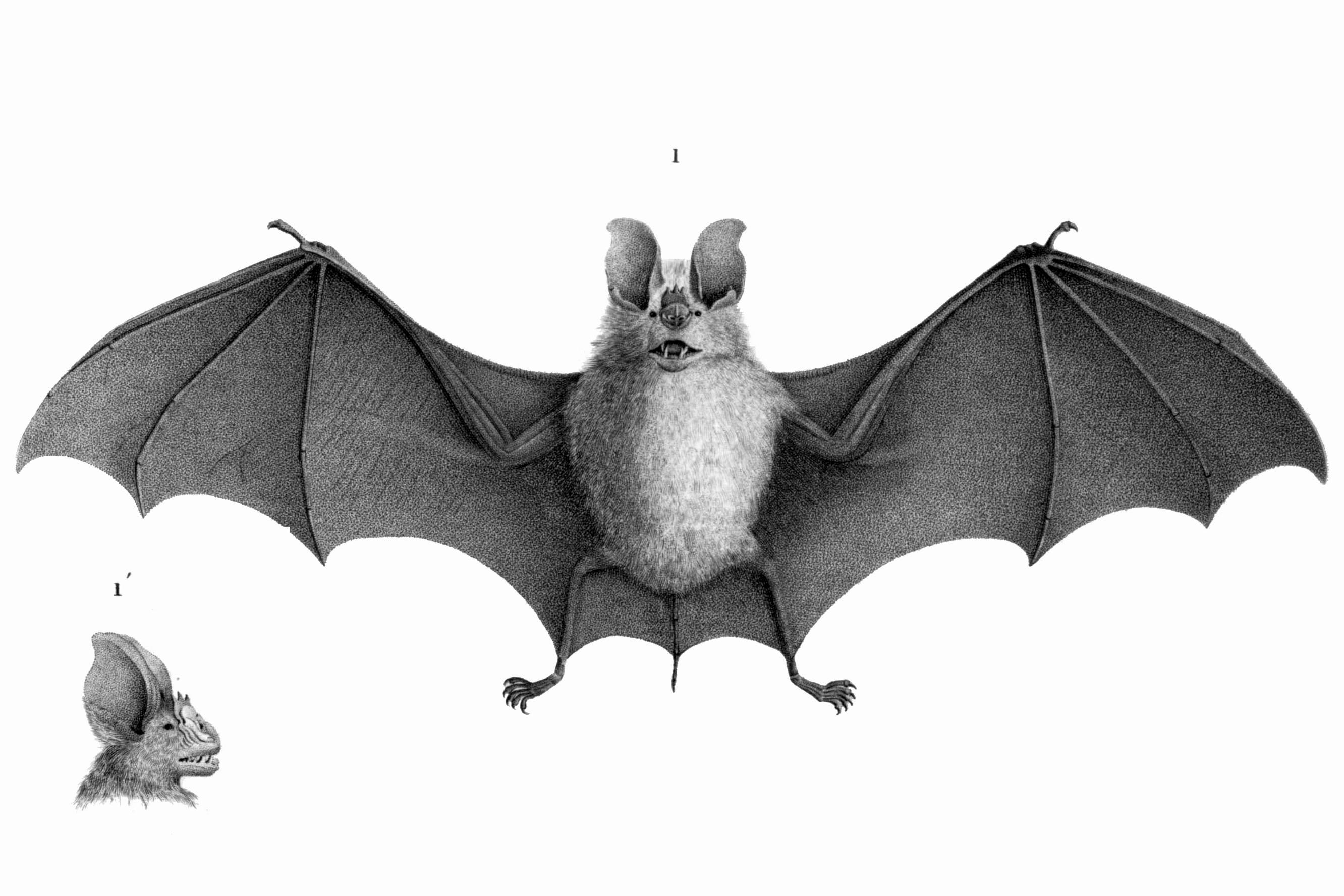
- Trident bat (Asellia tridens)

Scientific classification
- Kingdom: Animalia
- Phylum: Chordata
- Class: Mammalia
- Order: Chiroptera
- Family: Hipposideridae
- Genus: Asellia; Gray, 1838

Type species
- Rhinolophus tridens Geoffroy, 1813

Species
- See text

= Asellia =

Genus of mammals

Asellia is a genus of bat in the family Hipposideridae. It contains the following species:

- Arabian trident bat (Asellia arabica)
- Somalian trident bat (Asellia italosomalica)
- Patrizi's trident leaf-nosed bat (Asellia patrizii)
- Trident bat (Asellia tridens)
