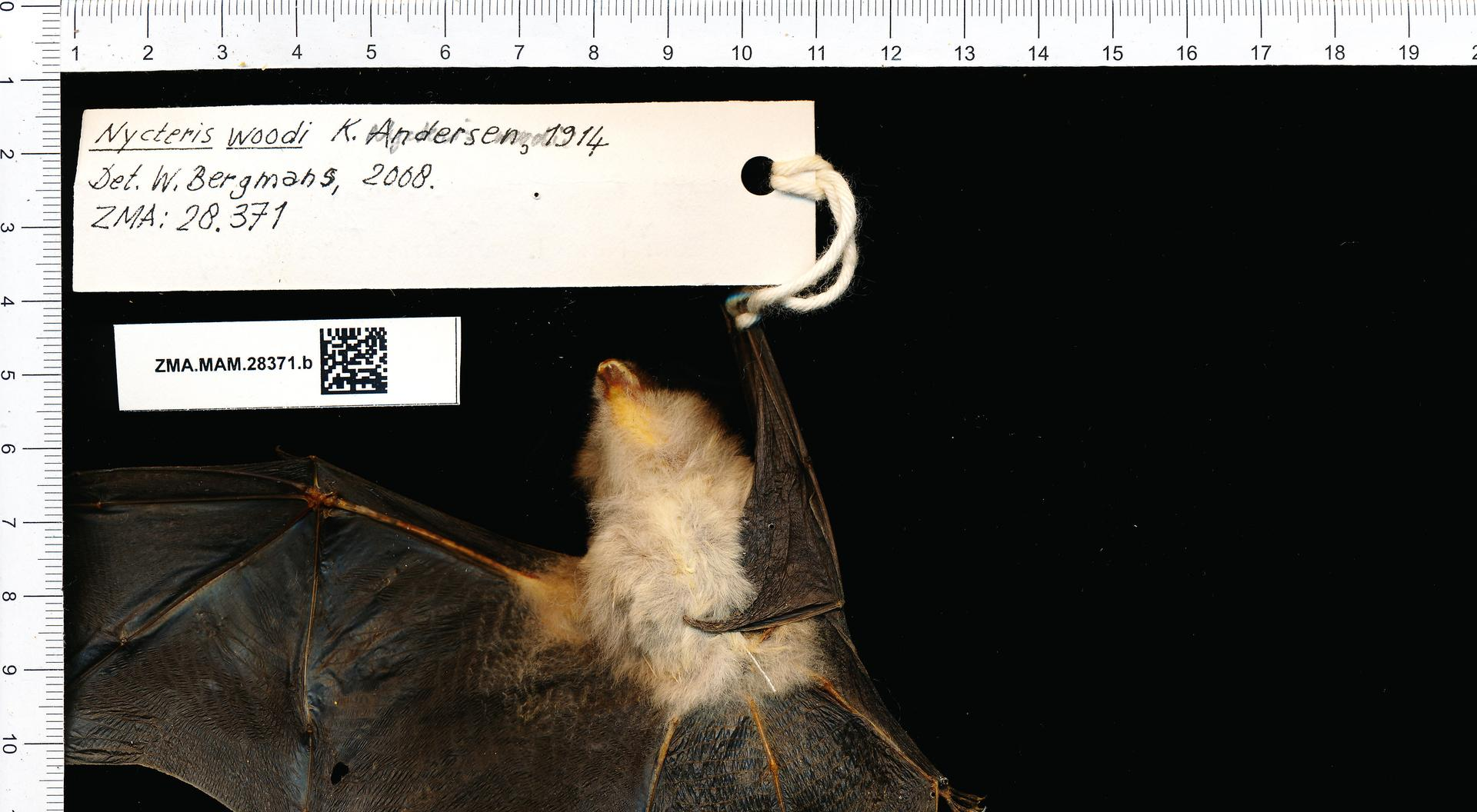

Conservation status
- Least Concern (IUCN 3.1)

Scientific classification
- Kingdom: Animalia
- Phylum: Chordata
- Class: Mammalia
- Order: Chiroptera
- Family: Nycteridae
- Genus: Nycteris
- Species: N. woodi

Binomial name
- Nycteris woodi K. Andersen, 1914

= Wood's slit-faced bat =

Species of bat

Wood's slit-faced bat (Nycteris woodi) is a species of slit-faced bat that lives in the dry savanna regions of Southern Africa. Its numbers are declining due to habitat loss from logging and farming, pesticide use, and the decline of baobab trees on which these bats depend for roost sites.
