= Gambian slit-faced bat =

Conservation status
- Least Concern (IUCN 3.1)

Scientific classification
- Kingdom: Animalia
- Phylum: Chordata
- Class: Mammalia
- Infraclass: Placentalia
- Order: Chiroptera
- Family: Nycteridae
- Genus: Nycteris
- Species: N. gambiensis

Binomial name
- Nycteris gambiensis K. Andersen, 1912

Species of bat

The Gambian slit-faced bat (Nycteris gambiensis) is a species of bat in the family Nycteridae found in Benin, Burkina Faso, Cameroon, Ivory Coast, Gambia, Ghana, Guinea, Guinea-Bissau, Mali, Mauritania, Niger, Nigeria, Senegal, Sierra Leone, and Togo. Its natural habitats are subtropical or tropical moist lowland forest and savanna.

== Discovery ==
Nycteris gambiensis was formally described in 1912 by Danish zoologist Knud Andersen. It was originally placed in the genus Petalia under the name Petalia gambiensis. The type specimen is a holotype, and the type locality was recorded as Dialacoto in the former French Gambia, now in Senegal. Andersen's original description was published in the journal Annals and Magazine of Natural History in 1912.

The species was subsequently transferred to the genus Nycteris, where it is currently recognised as Nycteris gambiensis. The original name Petalia gambiensis is now treated as a synonym. Modern taxonomic databases recognise N. gambiensis as a valid species within the family Nycteridae.

== Taxonomy ==
Nycteris gambiensis, commonly known as the "Gambian slit-faced bat", is a species of bat in the family Nycteridae and genus Nycteris. The species was described by Knud Andersen in 1912 and was originally named Petalia gambiensis. It is currently recognised as a valid species under the genus Nycteris.

The family Nycteridae is a group of bats commonly known as "slit-faced bats" or "hollow-faced bats". The family is currently represented by the genus Nycteris, which includes N. gambiensis and other slit-faced bat species.

== Description ==
It is a small to medium-sized bat with a relatively short forearm compared with some other species of the genus Nycteris. Its forearm length is approximately 35–44 mm. The ears are about 24–30 mm long. The species has relatively long, soft and woolly fur, with the upperparts ranging from dark beige to dark brown. Its coloration is generally less variable than that of the closely related Egyptian slit-faced bat (Nycteris thebaica).

Like other members of the family Nycteridae, N. gambiensis has a distinctive slit-like groove running along the muzzle. The nostrils are separated by this longitudinal groove, which extends towards a deep depression on the forehead. The tail has a characteristic T-shaped tip. These features contribute to the distinctive facial appearance of slit-faced bats.

The species is closely related to Nycteris thebaica, and the two can be difficult to distinguish using measurements alone because their morphological measurements show considerable overlap. However, differences in coloration and the shape of the tragus, together with multivariate morphological analysis, have been used to distinguish N. gambiensis from N. thebaica.
