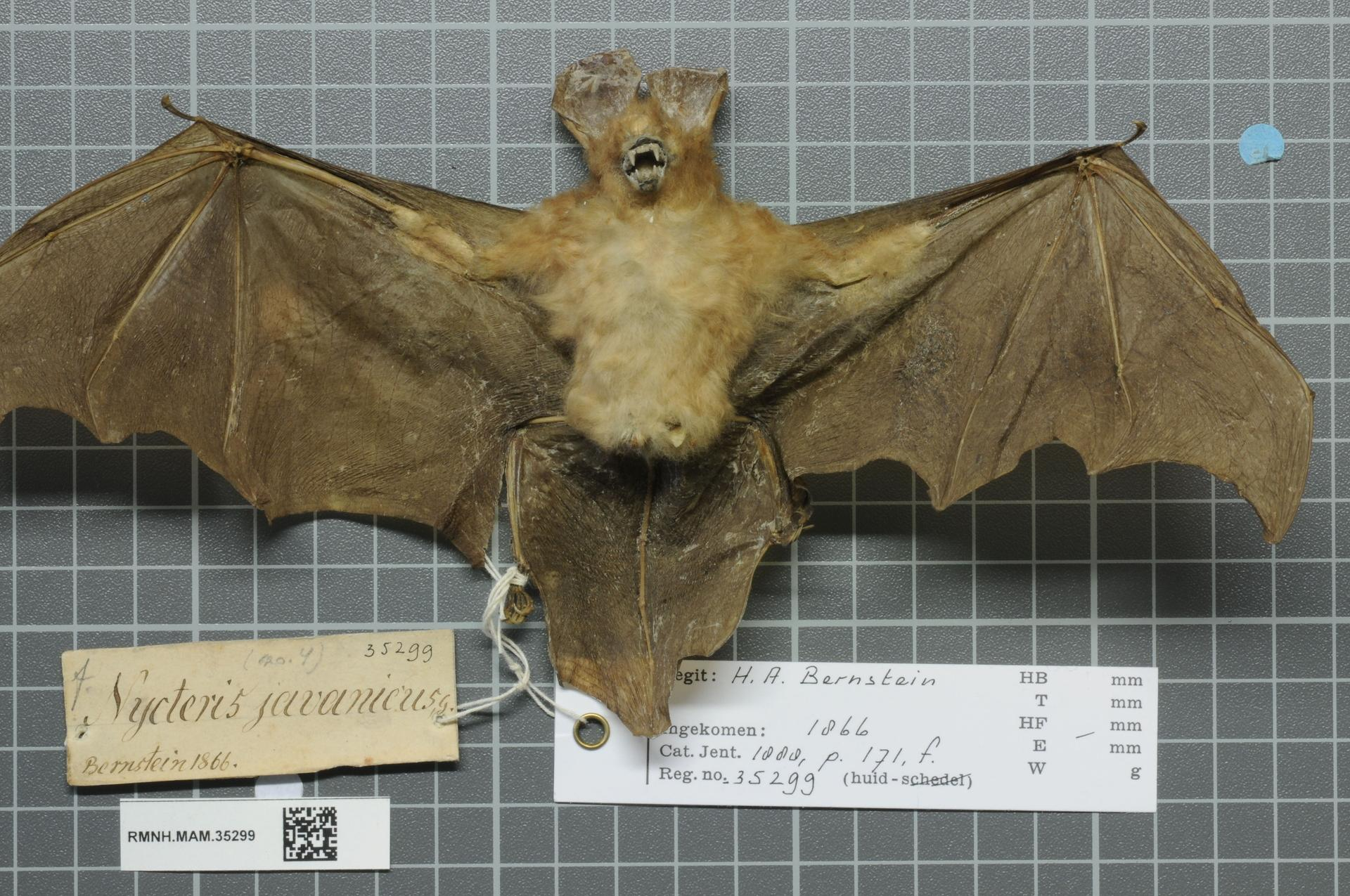

Conservation status
- Vulnerable (IUCN 3.1)

Scientific classification
- Kingdom: Animalia
- Phylum: Chordata
- Class: Mammalia
- Order: Chiroptera
- Family: Nycteridae
- Genus: Nycteris
- Species: N. javanica

Binomial name
- Nycteris javanica E. Geoffroy Saint-Hilaire, 1813

= Javan slit-faced bat =

Species of bat

The Javan slit-faced bat (Nycteris javanica) is a species of slit-faced bat found on the Kangean Islands of Indonesia, Nusa Penida, Java, and West Timor. The species' population is decreasing.

They have been recorded roosting in caves, coconut plantations, hollow bases of trees, and culverts, and live in small groups. The major threat to it is agriculture. It is protected in Gunung Pangrano.
