= Malayan roundleaf bat =

Conservation status
- Data Deficient (IUCN 3.1)

Scientific classification
- Kingdom: Animalia
- Phylum: Chordata
- Class: Mammalia
- Order: Chiroptera
- Family: Hipposideridae
- Genus: Macronycteris
- Species: H. nequam

Binomial name
- Hipposideros nequam K. Andersen, 1918
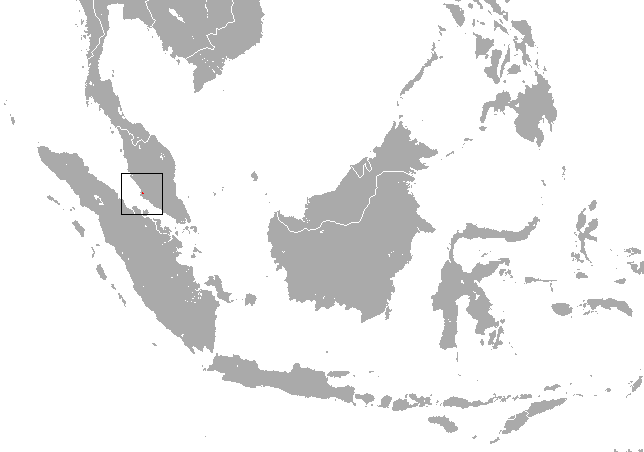
- Malayan roundleaf bat range

Species of bat

The Malayan roundleaf bat (Hipposideros nequam) is a horseshoe bat found only in Malaysia. It is listed as a data deficient species.

== Taxonomy ==
It was described as a new species in 1918 by Danish mammalogist Knud Andersen. The holotype had been collected in 1879 by W. Davison in Klang, Malaysia. It was presented to Andersen by Allan Octavian Hume. It is considered a member of the bicolor species group within Hipposideros based on its morphology. The holotype is the only known specimen of this species. As it was damaged, it is uncertain if the Malayan roundleaf bat is truly a distinct species. Its species name "nequam" is Latin for "worthless."

== Description ==
The forearm length of the holotype was 46 mm (1.8 in). It had a large nose-leaf of 6 mm (0.24 in) in length and 8 mm (0.31 in) in width. Its first premolar is small and its nasal septum is very thin.

== Range and status ==
The Malayan roundleaf bat is only known from the type locality of Klang, Malaysia. As of 2016, it was evaluated as a data deficient species by the IUCN.
