= Parissi's slit-faced bat =

Conservation status
- Data Deficient (IUCN 3.1)

Scientific classification
- Kingdom: Animalia
- Phylum: Chordata
- Class: Mammalia
- Order: Chiroptera
- Family: Nycteridae
- Genus: Nycteris
- Species: N. parisii

Binomial name
- Nycteris parisii de Beaux, 1924

Species of bat

Parissi's slit-faced bat (Nycteris parisii) is a species of slit-faced bat that may live in dry savanna regions of East Africa, near the Duba Valley and Benue River along with large rivers. It is only known from three specimens. One was found in northern Cameroon, one from southern Ethiopia, and the third from southern Somalia. Another possible specimen was found in West Africa, but it may be a member of a separate species, N. benuensis.

No specimens have been found since the 1980s. Little is known about the biology or behavior of N. parisii, and roosts have never been found.
