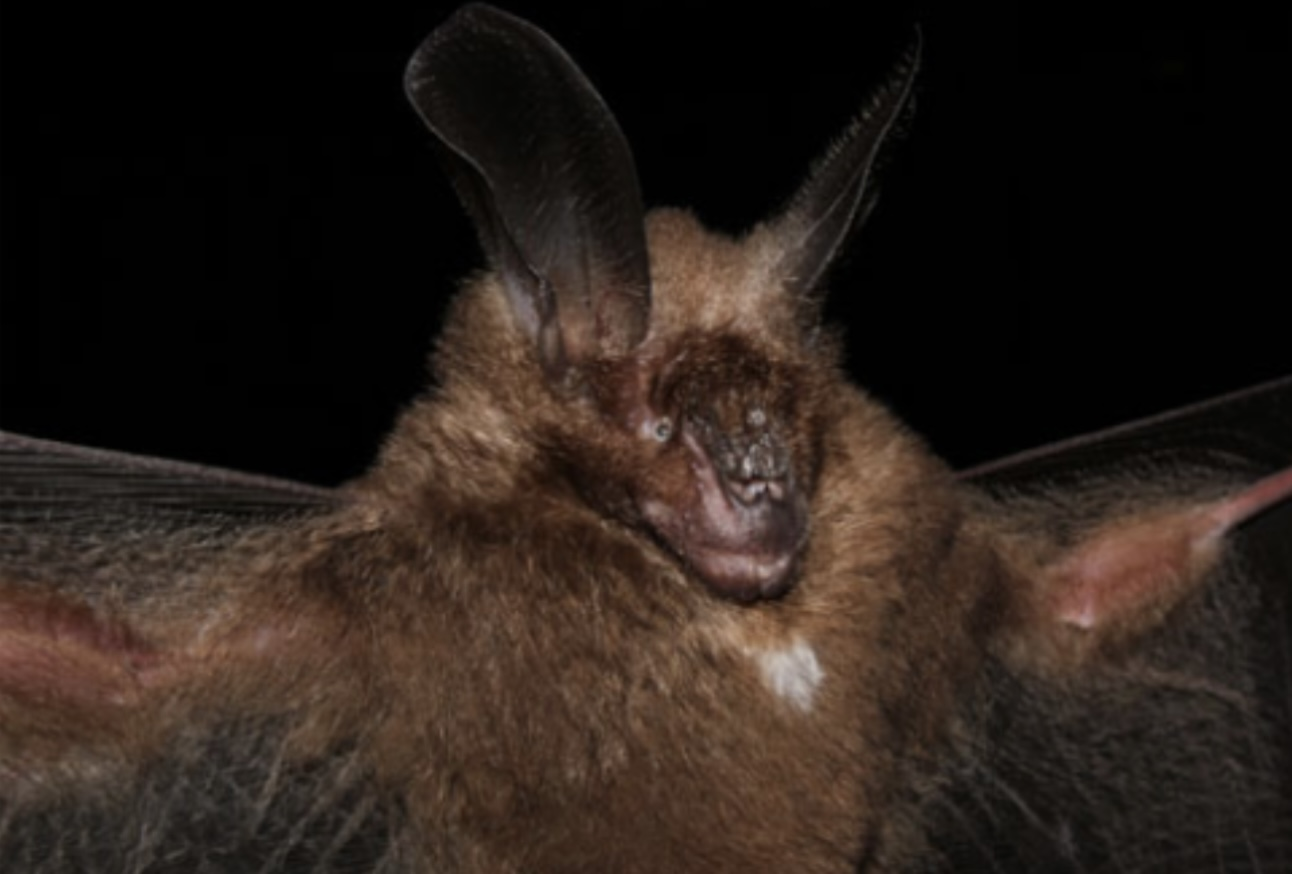

Conservation status
- Near Threatened (IUCN 3.1)

Scientific classification
- Kingdom: Animalia
- Phylum: Chordata
- Class: Mammalia
- Order: Chiroptera
- Family: Nycteridae
- Genus: Nycteris
- Species: N. tragata

Binomial name
- Nycteris tragata K. Andersen, 1912
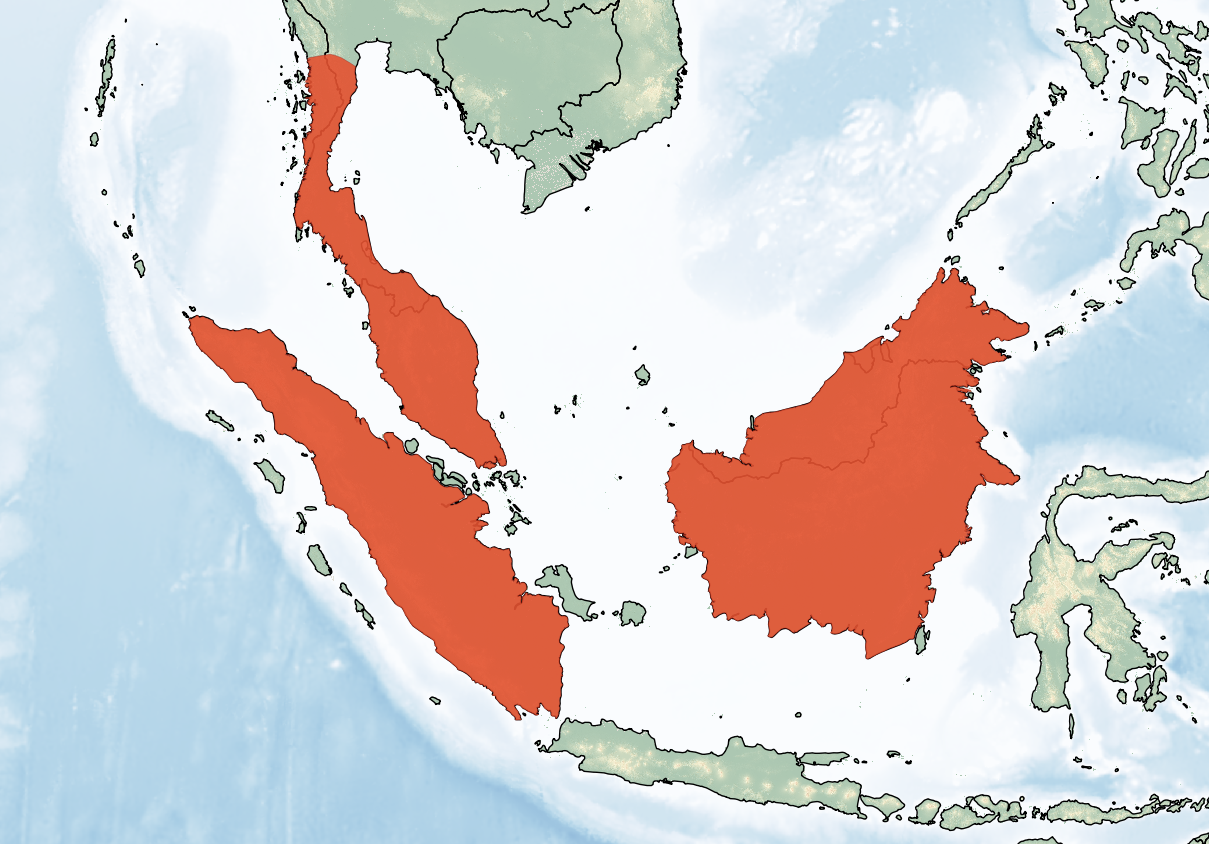

= Malayan slit-faced bat =

Species of bat

The Malayan slit-faced bat (Nycteris tragata) is a species of slit-faced bat that lives in Indonesia, Malaysia, Myanmar, and Thailand.
