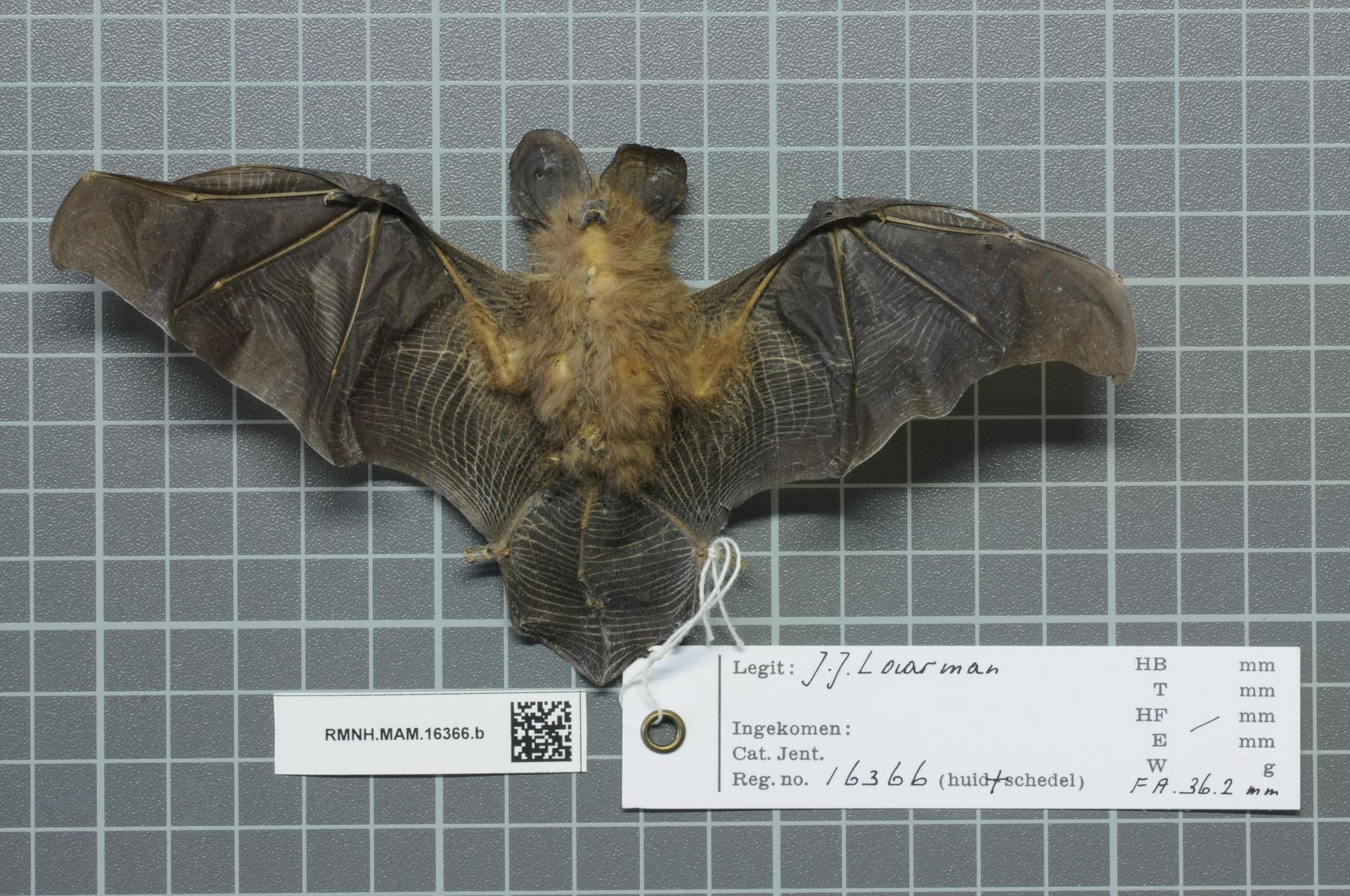

Conservation status
- Least Concern (IUCN 3.1)

Scientific classification
- Kingdom: Animalia
- Phylum: Chordata
- Class: Mammalia
- Order: Chiroptera
- Family: Nycteridae
- Genus: Nycteris
- Species: N. arge

Binomial name
- Nycteris arge Thomas, 1903

Synonyms
- Petalia arge (Thomas, 1903)

= Bates's slit-faced bat =

Species of bat

Bates's slit-faced bat (Nycteris arge) is a species of slit-faced bat frequently confused with Nycteris major. It is broadly distributed and common, living throughout many parts of Africa in forests and savannas.

It was described as a new species in 1903 by British zoologist Oldfield Thomas. The holotype had been collected from Cameroon by George Latimer Bates.

== Description ==
Bates's slit-faced bat, as the common name suggests, has a "deep median furrow" down its face. Its ears are large and rounded. Its dental formula is 2.1.1.33.1.2.3 for a total of 32 teeth. It has a particularly large brain for an insectivorous bat species.

== Range and status ==
It is found throughout Central and West Africa, including Angola, Benin, Burundi, Cameroon, Republic of the Congo, Democratic Republic of the Congo, Ivory Coast, Equatorial Guinea, Gabon, Ghana, Guinea, Kenya, Liberia, Nigeria, Rwanda, Sierra Leone, South Sudan, Tanzania, Togo, and Uganda. It is found in lowland areas.

In 2017, it was evaluated as a least-concern species by the IUCN.
