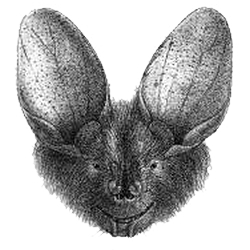

Conservation status
- Least Concern (IUCN 3.1)

Scientific classification
- Kingdom: Animalia
- Phylum: Chordata
- Class: Mammalia
- Order: Chiroptera
- Family: Nycteridae
- Genus: Nycteris
- Species: N. macrotis

Binomial name
- Nycteris macrotis Dobson, 1876

= Large-eared slit-faced bat =

Species of bat

The large-eared slit-faced bat (Nycteris macrotis), is a species of slit-faced bat which lives in forests and savannas throughout Africa. Nycteris vinsoni was once considered a synonym of N. macrotis, but it became recognized as a separate species in 2004. Some, however, still consider N. vinsoni to be a subspecies of N. macrotis, and consider N. macrotis a species complex.

Three subspecies have been identified:

- N. m. aethiopica
- N. m. luteola
- N. m. macrotis
