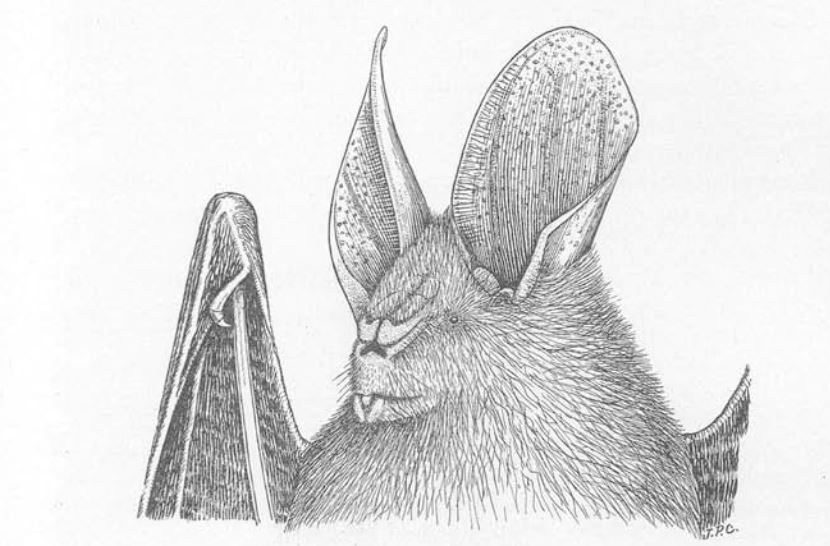

Conservation status
- Data Deficient (IUCN 3.1)

Scientific classification
- Kingdom: Animalia
- Phylum: Chordata
- Class: Mammalia
- Order: Chiroptera
- Family: Nycteridae
- Genus: Nycteris
- Species: N. major

Binomial name
- Nycteris major K. Andersen, (1912)

= Ja slit-faced bat =

Species of bat

The Ja slit-faced bat (Nycteris major) is a species of slit-faced bat that lives in the tropical and subtropical forests of Africa. Its habitat is fragmented and declining, and the species is therefore very rare. Logging and farming are currently the greatest threats to its habitat.

There are two known subspecies:

- N. m. avakubia
- N. m. major
