= Dwarf slit-faced bat =

Conservation status
- Least Concern (IUCN 3.1)

Scientific classification
- Domain: Eukaryota
- Kingdom: Animalia
- Phylum: Chordata
- Class: Mammalia
- Order: Chiroptera
- Family: Nycteridae
- Genus: Nycteris
- Species: N. nana

Binomial name
- Nycteris nana (K. Andersen, 1912)

Species of bat

The dwarf slit-faced bat (Nycteris nana) is a species of slit-faced bat living in forest and savanna regions of Central Africa. Two subspecies have been identified: N. n. nana and N. n. tristis.

The bat's range goes from Côte d'Ivoire and Ghana in the west, to Cameroon and the Democratic Republic of the Congo, from Rwanda and Burundi to Uganda and western Kenya, and to the south it ranges as far south as northern Angola. It is generally a lowland species. Its habitat has been recorded from both dry and moist lowland forest, gallery forest, and moist savanna. It has been found roosting in standing trees in small family groups.
