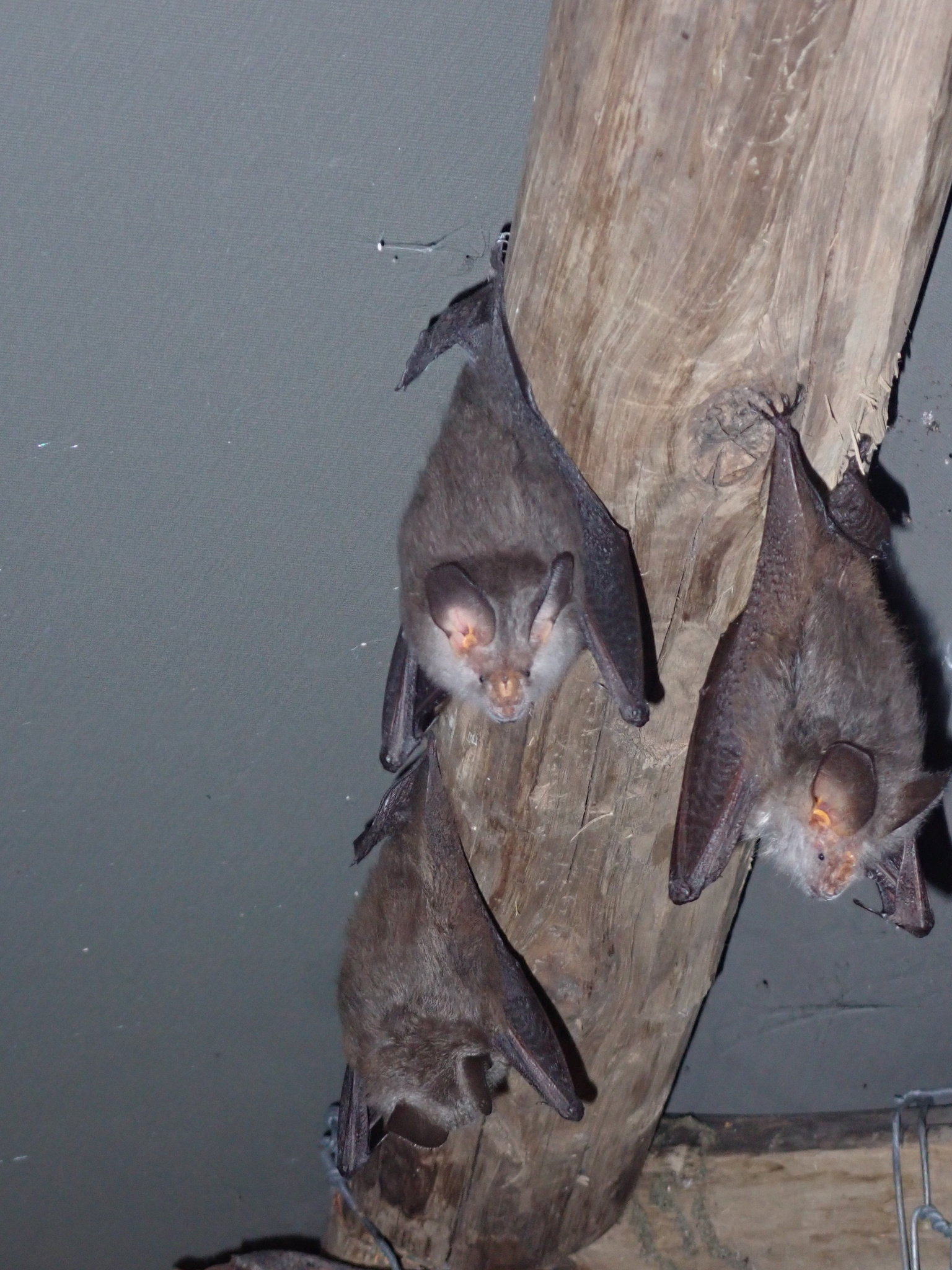

Conservation status
- Least Concern (IUCN 3.1)

Scientific classification
- Kingdom: Animalia
- Phylum: Chordata
- Class: Mammalia
- Infraclass: Placentalia
- Order: Chiroptera
- Family: Nycteridae
- Genus: Nycteris
- Species: N. hispida

Binomial name
- Nycteris hispida Schreber, (1775)

= Hairy slit-faced bat =

Species of bat

The hairy slit-faced bat (Nycteris hispida) is a species of slit-faced bat widely distributed throughout forests and savannas in Africa. Various forest populations in western and central Africa may represent separate species, although this had not been confirmed as of 2007.

Two recognized subspecies exist:

- N. h. hispida
- N. h. pallida

== Taxonomy ==
The hairy slit-faced bat, Nycteris hispida, is a species of bat in the family Nycteridae and genus Nycteris. The species was originally described by Johann Christian Daniel von Schreber in 1774 under the name Vespertilio hispidus. Its current scientific name is Nycteris hispida (von Schreber, 1774). The type locality is recorded as Senegal.

The genus Nycteris is the only genus in the family Nycteridae. Members of this family are commonly known as "slit-faced bats" and are characterised by a distinctive longitudinal slit on the muzzle. Nycteris hispida is currently recognised as a living species and is included in the order Chiroptera.

== Description ==
It is a small bat in the family Nycteridae. It has a distinctive facial structure, with a deep slit running along the muzzle towards the nostrils and a prominent nose-leaf surrounding the slit. Its ears are relatively long, although they are shorter than those of some other slit-faced bats, and they are connected near their bases by a membrane. The species has small eyes, broad wings and a long tail ending in a characteristic T-shaped tip formed by cartilage.

The fur is generally long and brown, with the underparts usually paler or greyer, while the wings and ears are darker. The forearm measures approximately 36–45 mm, and the ears are about 18–25 mm long. The species has a distinctive dental formula of 2/3, 1/1, 1/2, 3/3, giving a total of 32 teeth.

Like other slit-faced bats, N. hispida uses echolocation to navigate and locate prey. Its broad wings allow it to fly with considerable manoeuvrability, and it feeds mainly on insects, including moths and other small insects captured in flight or gleaned from surfaces.
