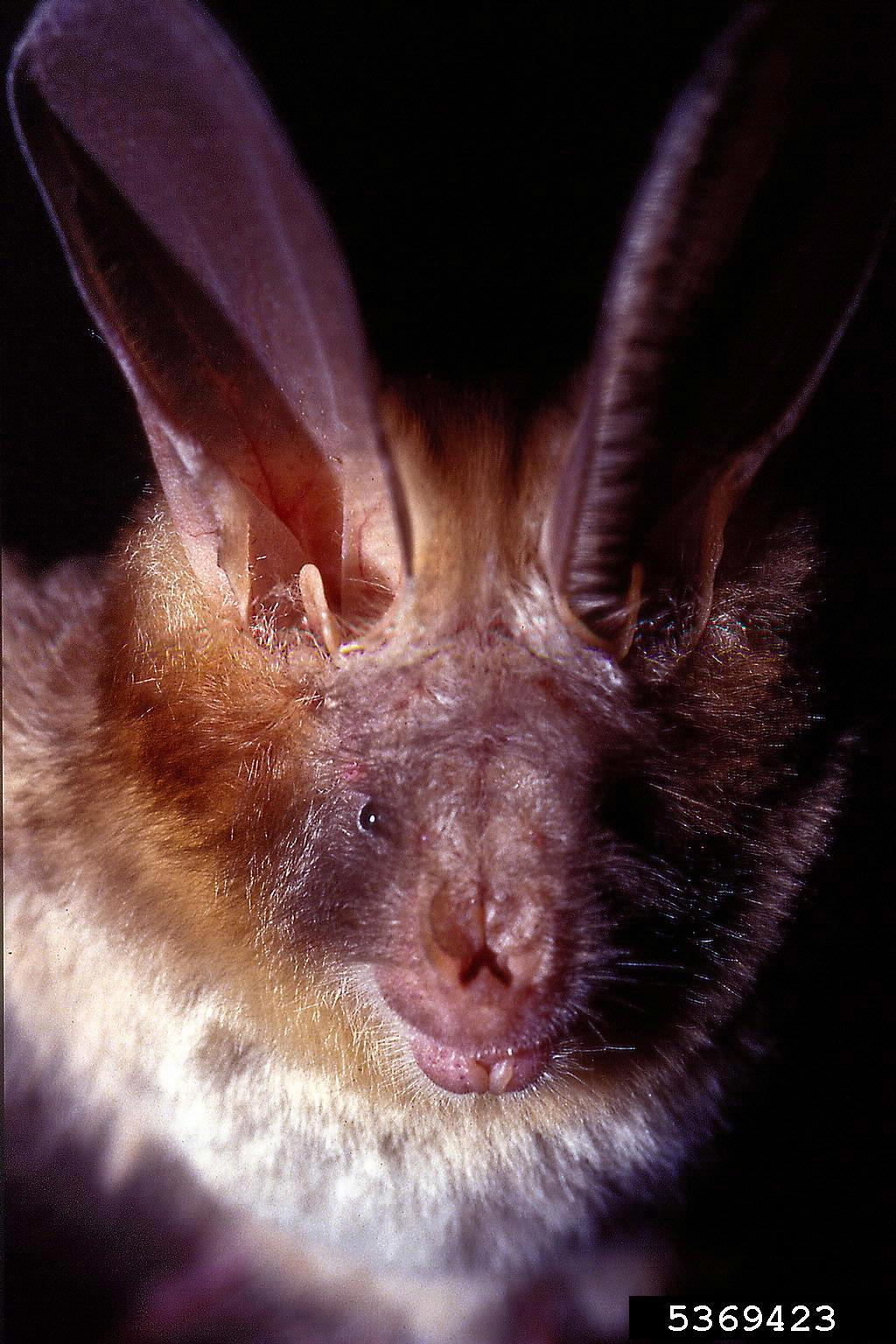
- Egyptian slit-faced bat (Nycteris thebaica)

Scientific classification
- Kingdom: Animalia
- Phylum: Chordata
- Class: Mammalia
- Infraclass: Placentalia
- Order: Chiroptera
- Family: Nycteridae; Hoeven, 1855
- Genus: Nycteris; G. Cuvier & E. Geoffroy Saint-Hilaire, 1795

Type species
- Vespertilio hispidus Schreber 1774

Species
- Nycteris arge; Nycteris aurita; Nycteris gambiensis; Nycteris grandis; Nycteris hispida; Nycteris intermedia; Nycteris javanica; Nycteris macrotis; Nycteris madagascariensis; Nycteris major; Nycteris nana; Nycteris parisii; Nycteris thebaica; Nycteris tragata; Nycteris vinsoni; Nycteris woodi
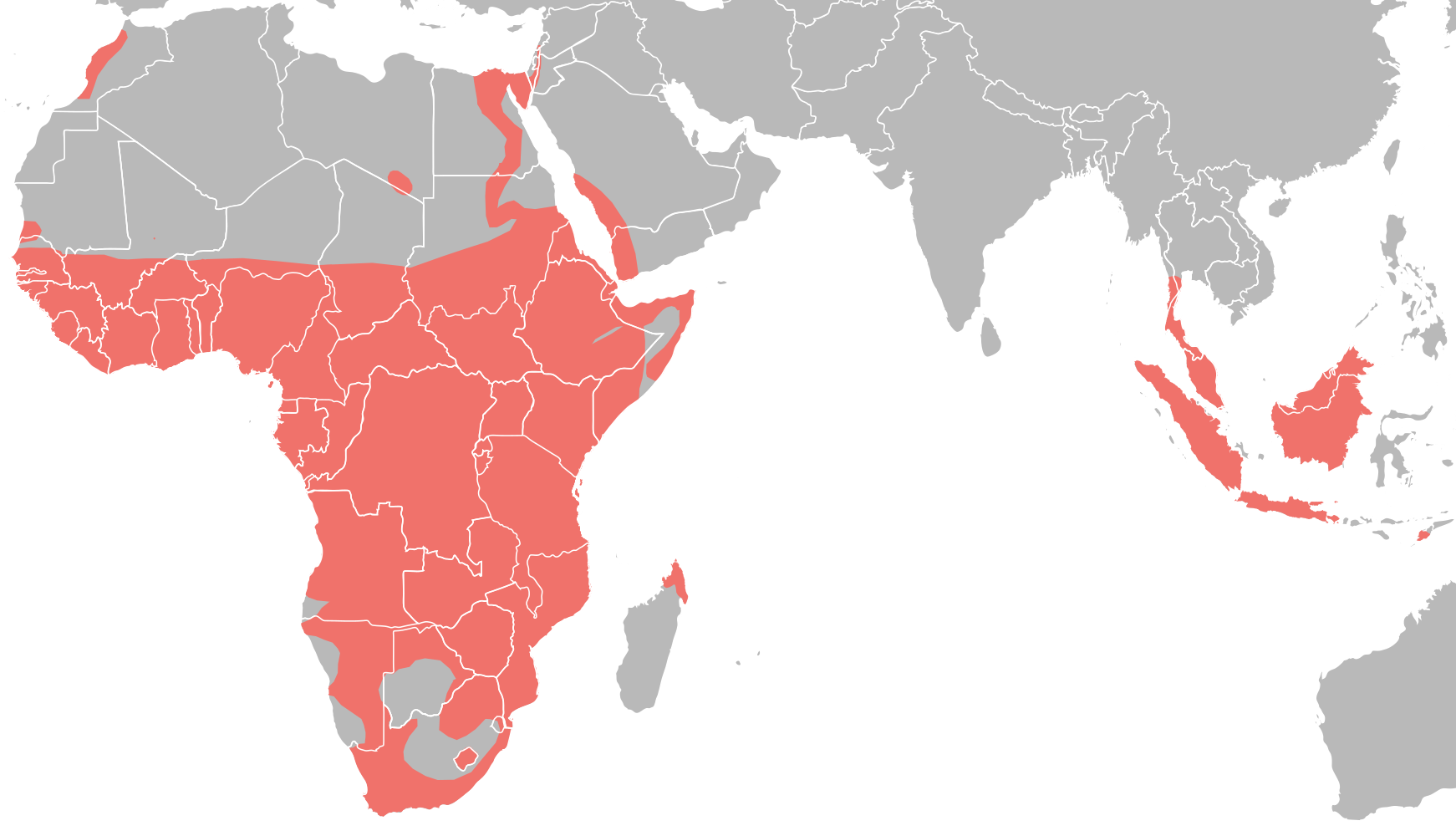
- Nycteridae distribution

= Nycteris =

Genus of bats

Nycteris comprises a genus of bats commonly called slit-faced or hollow-faced bats. They are grouped in the family Nycteridae. The bats are found in East Malaysia, Indonesia, and many parts of Africa.

== Description ==
They are small bats, from 4 to 8 centimetres (1.6 to 3.1 in) in body length, and with grey, brown, or reddish fur. The skull is distinguished by a characteristic interorbital concavity, externally connected to a long slit that runs down the centre of their faces from between the eyes to the nostrils, and probably assists in echolocation. They have large ears, and a complex nose-leaf. Their tails end in a T-shape, formed from cartilage, a unique feature among mammals. Their dental formula is:

Dentition
2.1.1.3
3.1.2.3

Nycterids have a reduction of the hand phalanges: the 2nd digit has only metacarpus, and the 3rd only two phalanges. The pectoral girdle has parallel features to birds. The sternum is strongly developed and the mesosternum has a keel.

== Habitat and biology ==
Slit-faced bats inhabit rainforests and savanna, and roost in caves, trees, and buildings, typically in fairly small colonies. Some even roost in animal burrows, such as those of hedgehogs, aardvarks or porcupines. They eat insects, and some terrestrial invertebrates, such as spiders and small scorpions. At least one species, the large slit-faced bat, even catches vertebrate prey, such as frogs and small birds.

The echolocation calls of slit-faced bats are relatively quiet and short in duration, and they seem to target their prey by hearing the sounds it produces, rather than by sonar. They give birth once or twice each year.

== Distribution ==
The genus Nycteris is found in the Afrotropics and the adjacent areas of Palaearctic, Madagascar and Oriental realms.

== Classification ==
Most sources report 13 species. However, 16 have been described. Those of indeterminate status are marked with "?" in the list below.

Family Nycteridae

- Genus Nycteris
  - Bates's slit-faced bat, N. arge
  - Andersen's slit-faced bat, N. aurita
  - Gambian slit-faced bat, N. gambiensis
  - Large slit-faced bat, N. grandis
  - Hairy slit-faced bat, N. hispida
    - N. h. hispida
    - N. h. pallida
  - Intermediate slit-faced bat, N. intermedia
  - Javan slit-faced bat, N. javanica
  - Large-eared slit-faced bat, N. macrotis
    - N. m. aethiopica
    - N. m. macrotis
    - N. m. luteola
  - Malagasy slit-faced bat, N. madagascariensis
  - Ja slit-faced bat, N. major
    - N. m. avakubia
    - N. m. major
  - Dwarf slit-faced bat, N. nana
    - N. n. nana
    - N. n. tristis
  - Egyptian slit-faced bat, N. thebaica
    - N. t. adana
    - N. t. albiventer
    - N. t. capensis
    - N. t. damarensis
    - N. t. najdiya
    - N. t. thebaica
  - Malayan slit-faced bat, N. tragata
  - Parissi's slit-faced bat, N. parisii ?
  - Vinson's slit-faced bat, N. vinsoni
  - Wood's slit-faced bat, N. woodi
