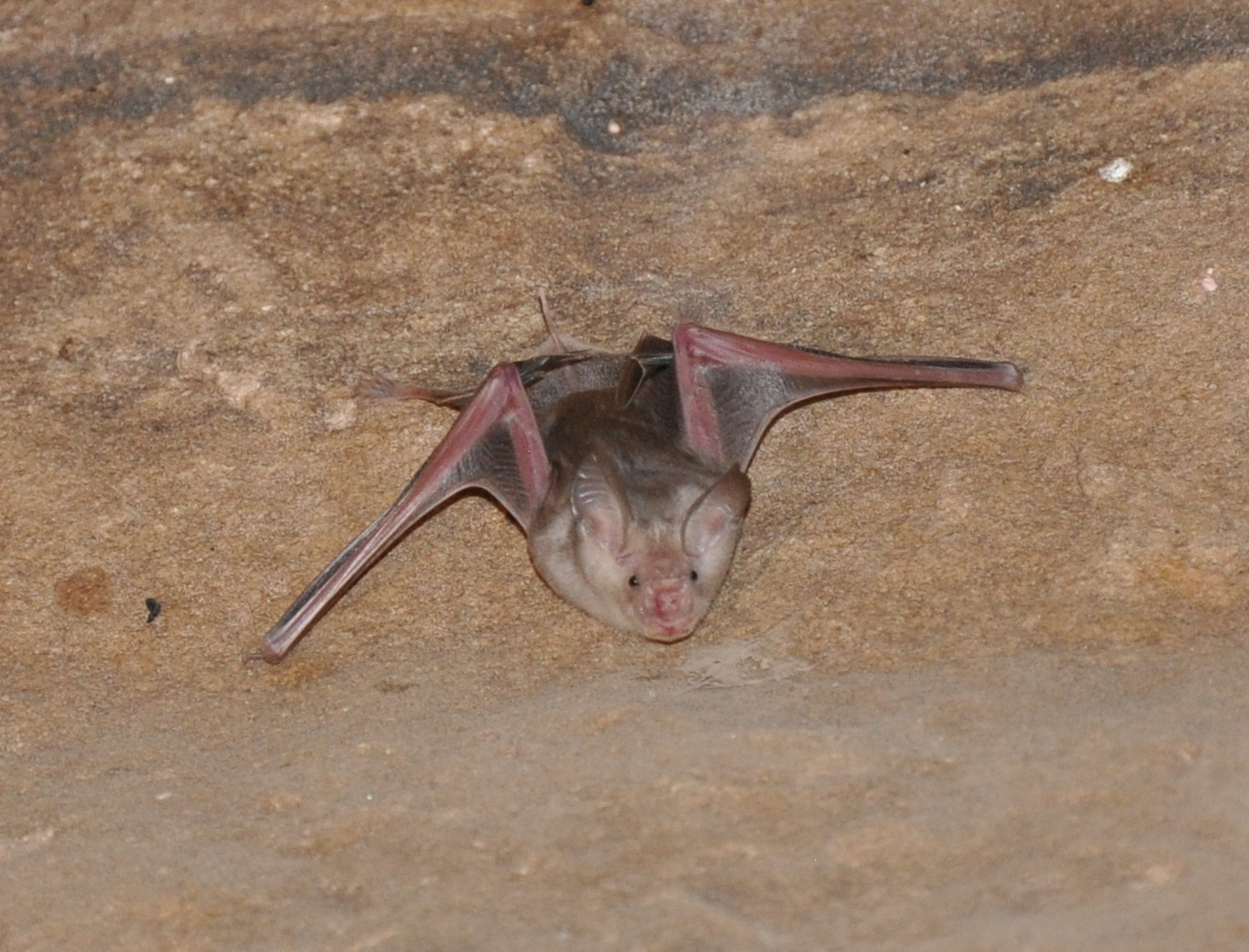

Conservation status
- Least Concern (IUCN 3.1)

Scientific classification
- Kingdom: Animalia
- Phylum: Chordata
- Class: Mammalia
- Order: Chiroptera
- Family: Hipposideridae
- Genus: Asellia
- Species: A. tridens

Binomial name
- Asellia tridens (É. Geoffroy, 1813)
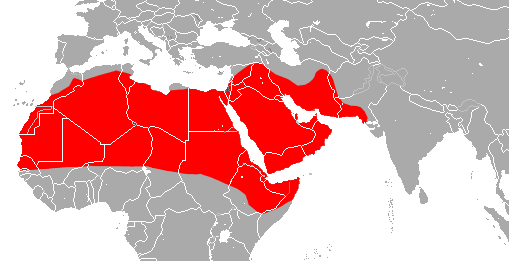
- Trident bat range

= Trident bat =

Species of bat

The trident bat or trident leaf-nosed bat (Asellia tridens) is a species of bat in the family Hipposideridae. It is widely distributed in the West, South and Central Asia, and North, East, and Central Africa. Its natural habitats are subtropical or tropical dry forests, dry savanna, subtropical or tropical dry shrubland, caves and hot deserts.

== Description ==
Individuals weigh 12–13 g (0.42–0.46 oz) and have forearm lengths of approximately 50 mm (2.0 in).

== Taxonomy ==
The trident bat was described as a new species in 1813 by French naturalist Étienne Geoffroy Saint-Hilaire. Geoffroy placed it in the genus Rhinolophus, with a scientific name of Rhinolophus tridens.

== Biology ==
After a gestation length of 10 weeks, females give birth in a three-week period in the end of June and beginning of July. The litter size for each female is one offspring, called a pup. Pups are relatively large at birth, weighing up to 30% of their mothers' weights (2.5–3 g (0.088–0.106 oz)). Though hairless at birth with closed eyes, a sign of altricial offspring, their eyes open by three or four days old, and fur has started growing. For the first two or three days of life, the pup is latched to its mother's pubic nipple at all times. At three or four days old, mothers leave their pups at the roost at night so they can forage. Pups become volant (able to fly) at around three weeks old, and are totally weaned and independent by six or seven weeks old.

Its predators include birds of prey such as the sooty falcon, lanner falcon, barn owl, Pharaoh eagle-owl, spotted eagle-owl, and Long-eared owl.

== Conservation ==
As of 2017, the trident bat is evaluated as a least-concern species by the IUCN. It meets the criteria for this classification due to its wide geographic range; presumably large population size; and the fact that it is not likely to be experiencing rapid population decline. Its range presumably encompasses several protected areas.
