= List of mammals of India =

This list of mammals of India comprises all the mammal species alive in India today. Some of them are common to the point of being considered vermin while others are exceedingly rare. Many species are known from just a few zoological specimens in museums collected in the 19th and 20th centuries. Many of the carnivores and larger mammals are restricted in their distribution to forests in protected areas, while others live within cities in the close proximity of humans. They range in size from the Eurasian pygmy shrew (Sorex minutus) to the Asian elephant (Elephas maximus). They include nocturnal small mammals endemic to India such as the Malabar large-spotted civet (Viverra civettina). While the status of many of these species is unknown, some are definitely extinct. Populations of many carnivores are threatened. The tiger (Panthera tigris), dhole (Cuon alpinus), and Malabar large-spotted civet (Viverra civettina) are some of the most endangered carnivore species. Two rhinoceros species are extinct within the Indian region, but the remaining species, the Indian rhinoceros (Rhinoceros unicornis) has its last stronghold within India.

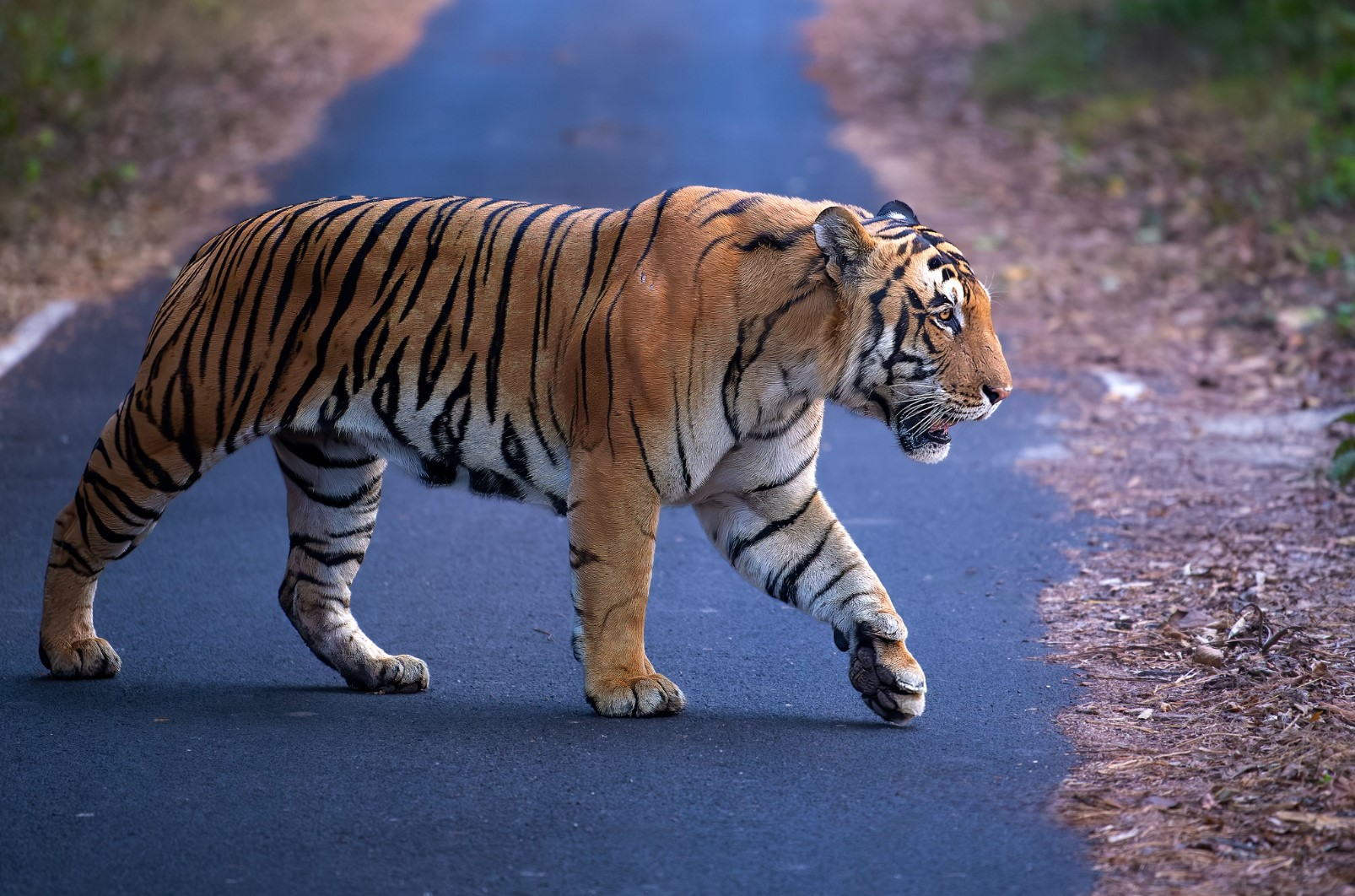
A Bengal tiger at Pilibhit Tiger Reserve

== Order: Eulipotyphla ==
=== Family Erinaceidae: hedgehogs ===
- Indian long-eared hedgehog (Hemiechinus collaris) (Gray, 1830)
- Brandt's hedgehog (Hemiechinus hypomelas) (Brandt, 1836)
- Indian hedgehog (Paraechinus micropus) (Blyth (1846))
- Madras hedgehog (Paraechinus nudiventris) (Horsfield, 1851) endemic

=== Family Talpidae: moles ===
- White-tailed mole (Parascaptor leucura) (Blyth, 1850)
- Himalayan mole (Euroscaptor micrura) (Hodgson, 1841)

=== Family Soricidae: shrews ===
==== Soricinae ====
- Chinese mole shrew (Anourosorex squamipes) Milne-Edwards, 1872
- Himalayan water shrew (Chimarrogale himalayica) (Gray, 1842)
- Elegant water shrew (Nectogale elegans) Milne-Edwards, 1870
- Eurasian pygmy shrew (Sorex minutus) Linnaeus, 1766
- Kashmir pygmy shrew (Sorex planiceps) Miller, 1911
- Hodgson's brown-toothed shrew (Soriculus caudatus) (Horsfield, 1851)
- Long-tailed brown-toothed shrew (Soriculus leucops) (Horsfield, 1851)
- Long-tailed mountain shrew (Soriculus macrurus) Blanford, 1888
- Himalayan shrew (Soriculus nigrescens) (Gray, 1842)

==== Crocidurinae ====
- Andaman shrew (Crocidura andamanensis) Miller, 1902
- Asian grey shrew (Crocidura attenuata) Milne-Edwards, 1872
- Southeast Asian shrew (Crocidura fuliginosa) (Blyth, 1856)
- Andaman spiny shrew (Crocidura hispida) Thomas, 1913
- Horsfield's shrew (Crocidura horsfieldii) (Tomes, 1856)
- Jenkins's shrew (Crocidura jenkinsi) Chakraborthy, 1978
- Bicolored shrew (Crocidura leucodon) (Zimmermann, 1780)
- Nicobar shrew (Crocidura nicobarica) Miller, 1902
- Pale grey shrew (Crocidura pergrisea) Miller, 1913
- Kashmir white-toothed shrew (Crocidura pullata) Miller, 1911
- †Sonnerat's shrew (Diplomesodon sonnerati) (Cheke, 2011)
- Kelaart's long-clawed shrew (Feroculus feroculus) (Kelaart, 1850)
- Day's shrew (Suncus dayi) (Dobson, 1888) (endemic)
- Etruscan shrew (Suncus etruscus) (Savi, 1822)
- Asian house shrew (Suncus murinus) (Linnaeus, 1766)
- Anderson's shrew (Suncus stoliczkanus) (Anderson, 1877)

== Order: Scandentia ==
=== Family Tupaiidae: treeshrews ===
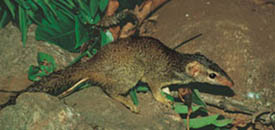
Indian tree-shrew (Anathana ellioti) in Yercaud, Tamil Nadu

==== Tupaiinae ====
- Madras treeshrew (Anathana ellioti) (Waterhouse, 1850)
- Northern treeshrew (Tupaia belangeri) (Wagner, 1841)
- Nicobar treeshrew (Tupaia nicobarica) (Zelebor, 1869)

== Order: Chiroptera: bats ==
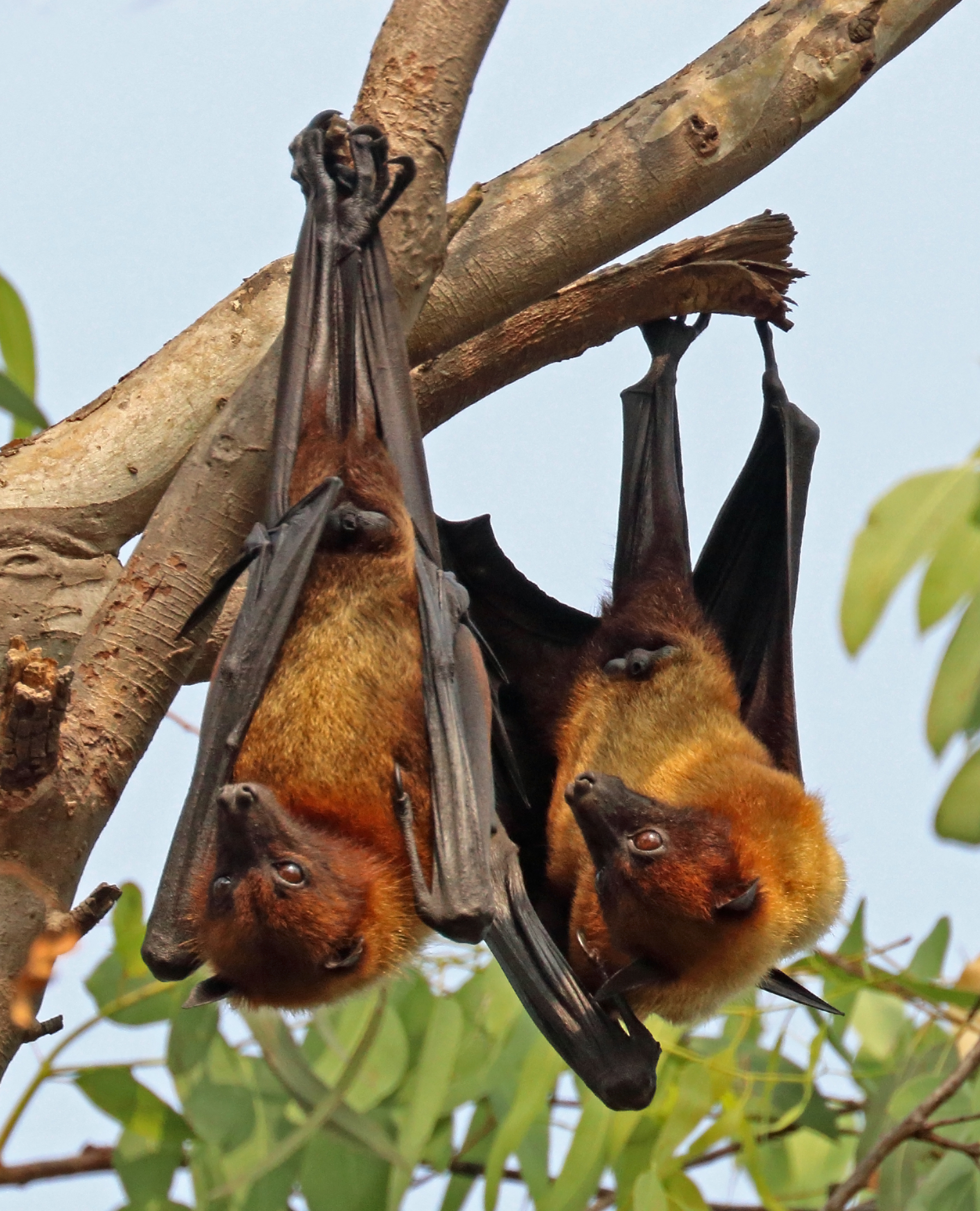
Indian flying foxes in Madhya Pradesh

=== Family Pteropodidae: fruit bats ===
- Lesser short-nosed fruit bat (Cynopterus brachyotis) (Müller, 1838)
- Greater short-nosed fruit bat (Cynopterus sphinx) (Vahl, 1797)
- Lesser dawn bat (Eonycteris spelaea) (Dobson, 1871)
- Cave nectar bat (Latidens salimalii) Thonglongya, 1972
- Long-tongued fruit bat (Macroglossus sobrinus) K. Andersen, 1911
- Ratanaworabhan's fruit bat (Megaerops niphanae) Yenbutra & Felten, 1983
- Nicobar flying fox (Pteropus faunulus) Miller, 1902
- Indian flying fox (Pteropus giganteus) (Brunnich, 1782) LC
- Small flying fox (Pteropus hypomelanus) Temminck, 1853
- Black-eared flying fox (Pteropus melanotus) Blyth, 1863
- Large flying fox (Pteropus vampyrus) (Linnaeus, 1758)
- Leschenault's rousette (Rousettus leschenaulti) (Desmarest, 1820)
- Blanford's fruit bat (Sphaerias blanfordi) (Thomas, 1891)

=== Family Rhinopomatidae: mouse-tailed bats ===
- Lesser mouse-tailed bat (Rhinopoma hardwickii) Gray, 1831
- Greater mouse-tailed bat (Rhinopoma microphyllum) (Brunnich, 1782)

=== Family Emballonuridae: sheath-tailed bats ===
- Long-winged tomb bat (Taphozous longimanus) Hardwicke, 1825
- Black-bearded tomb bat (Taphozous melanopogon) Temminck, 1841
- Naked-rumped tomb bat (Taphozous nudiventris) Cretzschmar, 1830
- Egyptian tomb bat (Taphozous perforatus) E. Geoffroy, 1818
- Naked-rumped pouched bat (Saccolaimus saccolaimus) (Temminck, 1838)
- Theobald's tomb bat (Taphozous theobaldi) Dobson, 1872

=== Family Megadermatidae: false vampire bats ===
- Greater false vampire bat (Megaderma lyra) E. Geoffroy, 1810
- Lesser false vampire bat (Megaderma spasma) (Linnaeus, 1758)

=== Family Rhinolophidae: horseshoe bats ===
- Intermediate horseshoe bat (Rhinolophus affinis) Horsfield, 1823
- Homfray's horseshoe bat (Rhinolophus andamanensis) Dobson, 1872
- Lesser woolly horseshoe bat (Rhinolophus beddomei) Andersen, 1905
- Andaman horseshoe bat (Rhinolophus cognatus) K. Andersen, 1906
- Greater horseshoe bat (Rhinolophus ferrumequinum) (Schreber, 1774)
- Lesser horseshoe bat (Rhinolophus hipposideros) (Bechstein, 1800)
- Rhinolophus indorouxii Chattopodhaya et al., 2012
- Blyth's horseshoe bat (Rhinolophus lepidus) Blyth, 1844
- Big-eared horseshoe bat (Rhinolophus macrotis) Blyth, 1844
- Woolly horseshoe bat (Rhinolophus luctus) Temminck, 1835
- Mitred horseshoe bat (Rhinolophus mitratus) Blyth, 1844 endemic to Bihar
- Pearson's horseshoe bat (Rhinolophus pearsonii) Horsfield, 1851
- Northern woolly horseshoe bat (Rhinolophus perniger) Hodgson, 1843
- Least horseshoe bat (Rhinolophus pusillus ) Temminck, 1834
- Rufous horseshoe bat (Rhinolophus rouxi) Temminck, 1835
- Shortridge's horseshoe bat (Rhinolophus shortridgei) Andersen, 1918
- Chinese rufous horseshoe bat (Rhinolophus sinicus) Andersen, 1905
- Little Nepalese horseshoe bat (Rhinolophus subbadius) Blyth, 1844
- Trefoil horseshoe bat (Rhinolophus trifoliatus) Temminck, 1834
- Dobson's horseshoe bat (Rhinolophus yunanensis) Dobson, 1872

=== Family Hipposideridae: leaf-nosed bats ===
- trident leaf-nosed bat (Asellia tridens)
- East Asian tailless leaf-nosed bat (Coelops frithii) Blyth, 1848
- Great roundleaf bat (Hipposideros armiger) (Hodgson, 1835)
- Dusky leaf-nosed bat (Hipposideros ater) Templeton, 1848
- Ashy roundleaf bat (Hipposideros cineraceus) Blyth, 1853
- Khajuria's leaf-nosed bat (Hipposideros durgadasi) Khajuria, 1970
- Diadem leaf-nosed bat (Hipposideros diadema) E. Geoffroy, 1813
- Fulvus roundleaf bat (Hipposideros fulvus) Gray, 1838
- Cantor's roundleaf bat (Hipposideros galeritus) Cantor, 1846
- Indian roundleaf bat (Hipposideros lankadiva) Kelaart, 1850
- Intermediate roundleaf bat (Hipposideros larvatus) (Horsfield, 1823)
- Pomona roundleaf bat (Hipposideros pomona) K. Andersen, 1918
- Indian roundleaf bat (Hipposideros schistaceus) K. Andersen, 1918
- Schneider's leaf-nosed bat (Hipposideros speoris) (Schneider, 1800)

=== Family Vespertilionidae: evening bats ===
- Asian barbastelle (Barbastella leucomelas) (Cretzschmar, 1830)
- Northern bat (Eptesicus nilssoni) (Keyserling & Blasius, 1839) endemic to Kashmir
- Gobi big brown bat (Eptesicus gobiensis) Bobrinski, 1926
- Thick-eared bat (Eptesicus pachyotis) (Dobson, 1871)
- Serotine bat (Eptesicus serotinus) (Schreber, 1774)
- Sombre bat (Eptesicus tatei) Ellerman & Morrison-Scott, 1951
- Tickell's bat (Hesperoptenus tickelli) (Blyth, 1851)
- Blanford's bat (Hesperoptenus blanfordi) Dobson, 1877
- Great evening bat (Ia io) Thomas, 1902
- Hairy-faced bat (Myotis annectans) (Dobson, 1871)
- Lesser mouse-eared bat (Myotis blythii) (Tomes, 1857)
- Daubenton's bat (Myotis daubentonii) (Kuhl, 1817)
- Hodgson's bat (Myotis formosus) (Hodgson, 1835)
- Lesser large-footed bat (Myotis hasseltii) (Temminck, 1840)
- Horsfield's bat (Myotis horsfieldii) (Temminck, 1840)
- Kashmir cave bat (Myotis longipes) (Dobson, 1873)
- Burmese whiskered bat (Myotis montivagus) (Dobson, 1874)
- Wall-roosting mouse-eared bat (Myotis muricola) (Gray, 1846)
- Whiskered bat (Myotis mystacinus) (Kuhl, 1817)
- Peshwa bat (Myotis peshwa) (Thomas, 1915)
- Mandelli's mouse-eared bat (Myotis sicarius) Thomas, 1915
- Himalayan whiskered bat (Myotis siligorensis) (Horsfield, 1855)
- Lesser noctule (Nyctalus leisleri) (Kuhl, 1817)
- Mountain noctule (Nyctalus montanus) (Barrett-Hamilton, 1906)
- Common noctule (Nyctalus noctula) (Schreber, 1774)
- Desert long-eared bat (Otonycteris hemprichii) Peters, 1859
- Dormer's bat (Scotozous dormeri) Dobson, 1875
- Chocolate pipistrelle (Pipistrellus affinis) (Dobson, 1871)
- Cadorna's pipistrelle (Pipistrellus cadornae) Thomas, 1916
- Kelaart's pipistrelle (Pipistrellus ceylonicus) (Kelaart, 1852)
- Indian pipistrelle (Pipistrellus coromandra) (Gray, 1838)
- Java pipistrelle (Pipistrellus javanicus) (Gray, 1838)
- Kuhl's pipistrelle (Pipistrellus kuhlii) (Kuhl, 1817)
- Mount Popa pipistrelle (Pipistrellus paterculus) Thomas, 1915
- Common pipistrelle (Pipistrellus pipistrellus) (Schreber, 1774)
- Savi's pipistrelle (Pipistrellus savii) (Bonaparte, 1837)
- Least pipistrelle (Pipistrellus tenuis) (Temminck, 1840)
- Brown long-eared bat (Plecotus auritus) (Linnaeus, 1758)
- Grey long-eared bat (Plecotus austriacus) (J. Fischer, 1829)
- Desert yellow bat (Scotoecus pallidus) (Dobson, 1876)
- Harlequin bat (Scotomanes ornatus) (Dobson, 1871)
- Greater Asiatic yellow bat (Scotophilus heathii) (Horsfield, 1831)
- Lesser Asiatic yellow bat (Scotophilus kuhlii) Leach, 1821
- Lesser bamboo bat (Tylonycteris pachypus) (Temminck, 1840)
- Parti-coloured bat (Vespertilio murinus) Linnaeus, 1758
- Small bent-winged bat (Miniopterus pusillus) Dobson, 1876
- Common bent-wing bat (Miniopterus schreibersii) (Kuhl, 1817)
- Lesser hairy-winged bat (Harpiocephalus harpia) Gray, 1842
- Round-eared tube-nosed bat (Murina cyclotis) Dobson, 1872
- Peters's tube-nosed bat (Murina grisea) Peters, 1872
- Hutton's tube-nosed bat (Murina huttoni) (Peters, 1872)
- Greater tube-nosed bat (Murina leucogaster) Milne-Edwards, 1872
- Scully's tube-nosed bat (Murina tubinaris) (Scully, 1881)
- Little tube-nosed bat (Murina aurata) Milne-Edwards, 1872
- Rainforest tube-nosed bat (Murina pluvialis) Ruedi, Biswas & Csorba, 2012
- Jaintia tube-nosed bat (Murina jaintiana) Ruedi, Biswas & Csorba, 2012
- Hardwicke's woolly bat (Kerivoula hardwickii) (Horsfield, 1824)
- Papillose woolly bat (Kerivoula papillosa) (Temminck, 1840)
- Painted bat (Kerivoula picta) (Pallas, 1767)

=== Family Molossidae: free-tailed bats ===
- Wroughton's free-tailed bat (Otomops wroughtoni) (Thomas, 1913)
- Egyptian free-tailed bat (Tadarida aegyptiaca) (E. Geoffroy, 1818)
- European free-tailed bat (Tadarida teniotis) (Rafinesque, 1814)
- Wrinkle-lipped free-tailed bat (Chaerephon plicatus) (Buchanan, 1800)

== Order: Primates ==
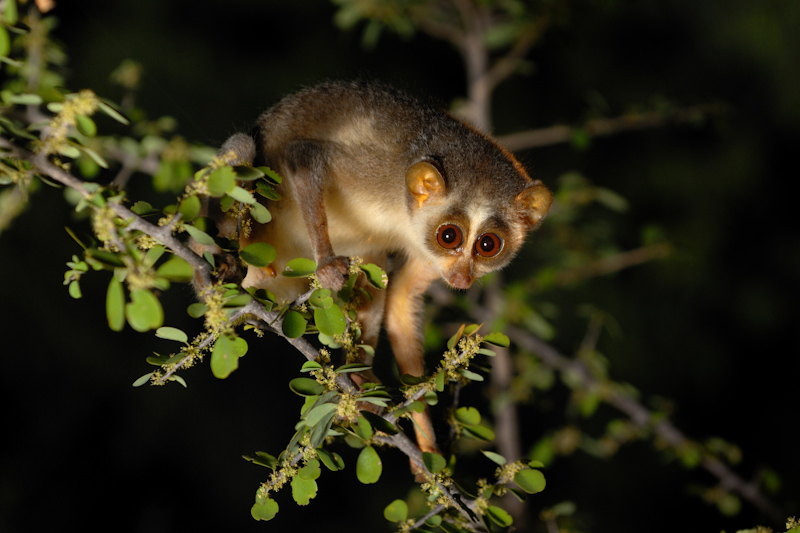
Slender loris in Tamil Nadu

=== Family Lorisidae: lorises ===
- Bengal slow loris (Nycticebus bengalensis) (Lacépède, 1800)
- Gray slender loris (Loris lydekkerianus) (É. Geoffroy, 1796)

=== Family Cercopithecidae: Old World monkeys ===
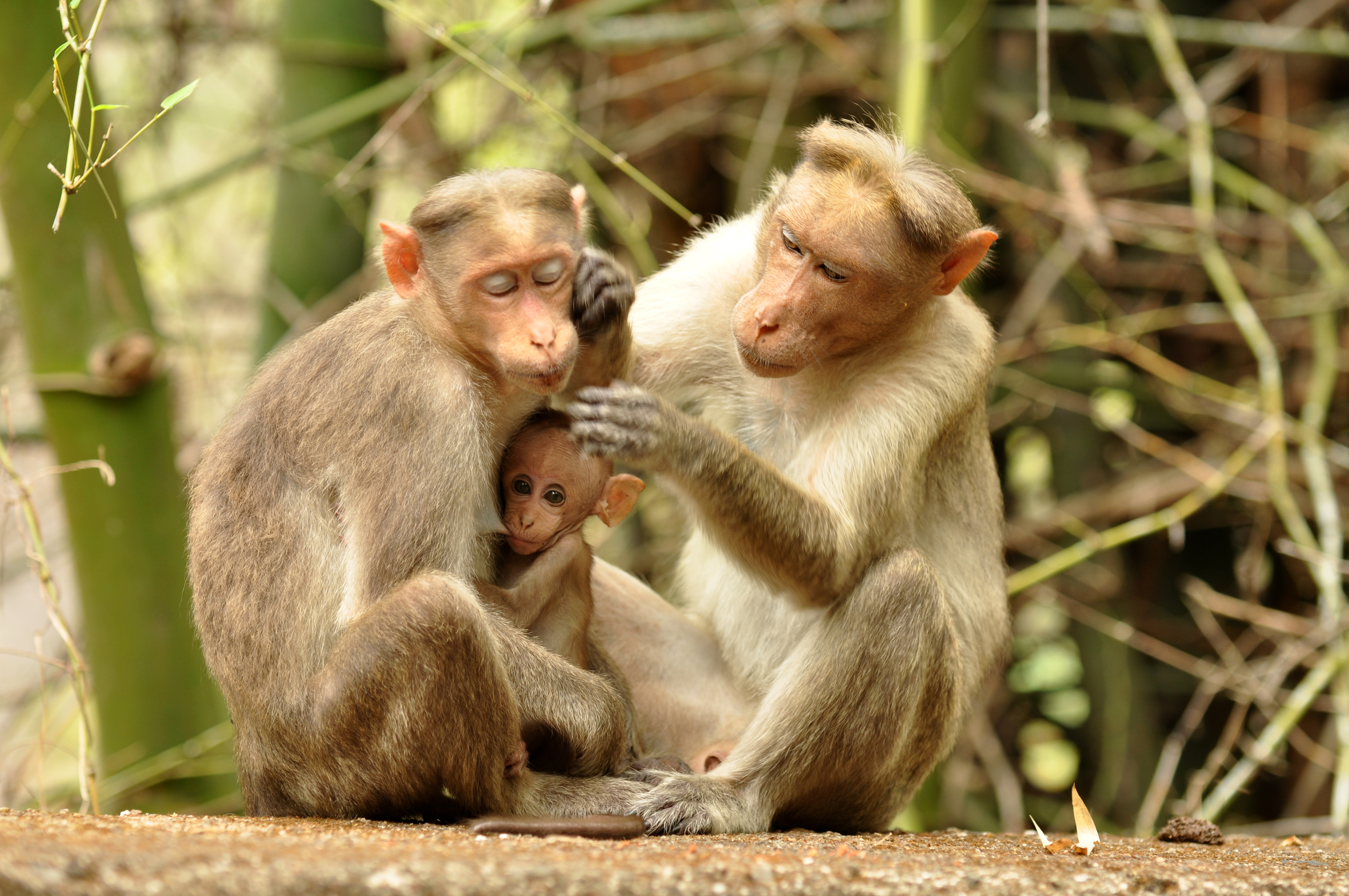
Bonnet macaque

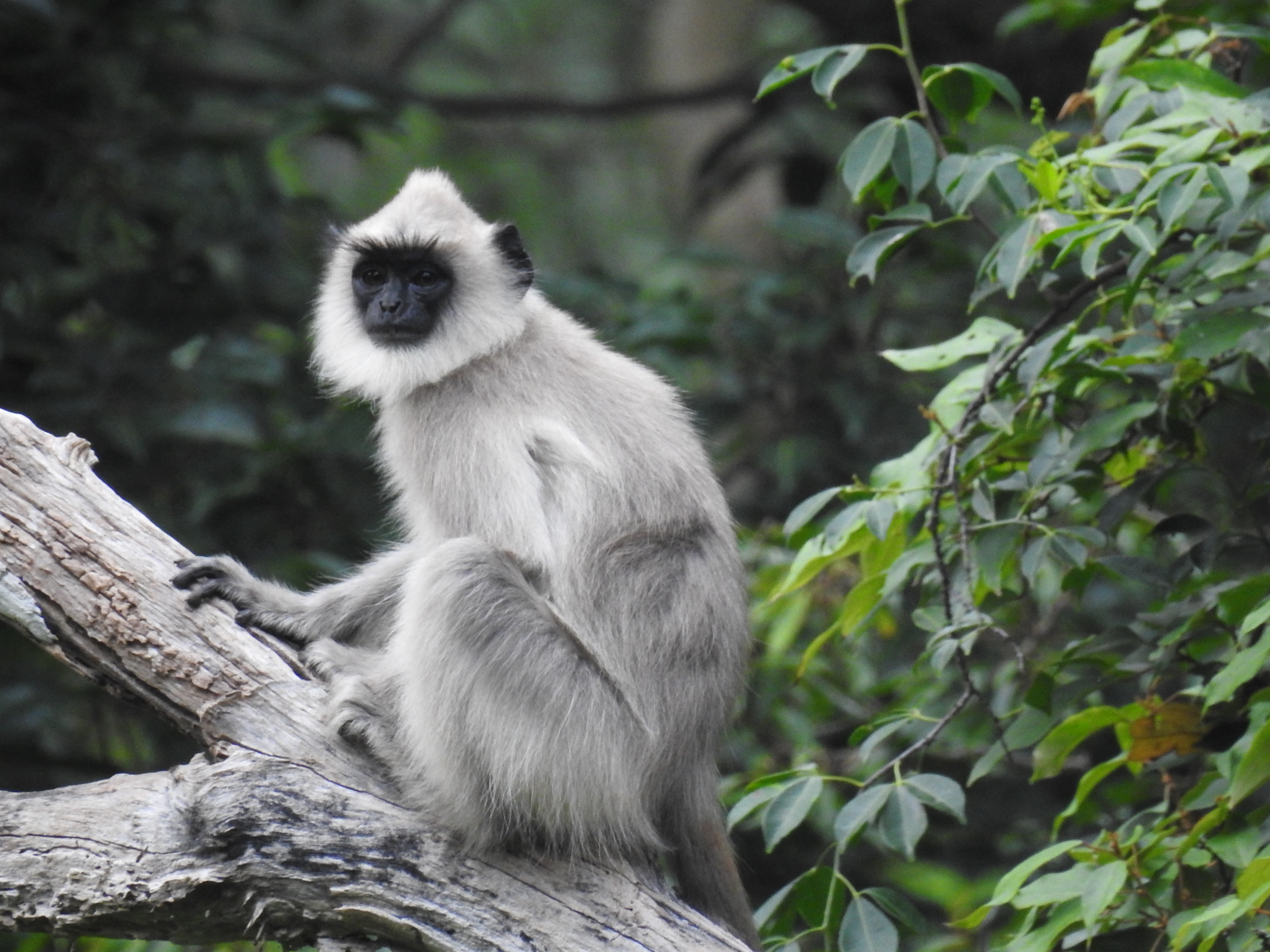
Tufted grey langur

- Stump-tailed macaque (Macaca arctoides) (I. Geoffroy, 1831)
- Assam macaque (Macaca assamensis) (M'Clelland, 1840)
- Nicobar long-tailed macaque (Macaca fascicularis umbrosa) Miller, 1902
- Rhesus macaque (Macaca mulatta) (Zimmermann, 1780)
- Arunachal macaque (Macaca munzala) Sinha et al., 2004
- Northern pig-tailed macaque (Macaca leonina) (Blyth, 1863)
- Bonnet macaque (Macaca radiata) (E. Geoffroy, 1812)
- Lion-tailed macaque (Macaca silenus) (Linnaeus, 1758)
- White-cheeked macaque (Macaca leucogenys)
- Nepal grey langur (Semnopithecus schistaceus) (Hodgson, 1840)
- Tarai grey langur (Semnopithecus hector) (Pocock, 1928)
- Kashmir grey langur (Semnopithecus ajax) (Pocock, 1928)
- Northern plains grey langur (Semnopithecus entellus) (Dufresne, 1797)
- Southern plains grey langur (Semnopithecus dussumieri) (Dufresne, 1797)
- Black-footed grey langur (Semnopithecus hypoleucos) Blyth, 1841
- Tufted grey langur (Semnopithecus priam) Blyth, 1844
- Capped langur (Trachypithecus pileatus) (Blyth, 1843)
- Phayre's leaf monkey (Trachypithecus phayrei) (Blyth, 1847)
- Nilgiri langur (Trachypithecus johnii) (J. Fischer, 1829)
- Gee's golden langur (Trachypithecus geei) (Khajuria, 1956)

=== Family Hylobatidae: lesser apes (gibbons) ===
Earlier classified as a single species, the hoolock gibbon (Hylobates hoolock) has been reclassified as follows:

- Western hoolock gibbon (Hoolock hoolock) (Harlan, 1834)
- Eastern hoolock gibbon (Hoolock leuconedys) (Groves, 1967)

== Order: Carnivora: Carnivorans ==
=== Family Canidae: canines/dogs ===
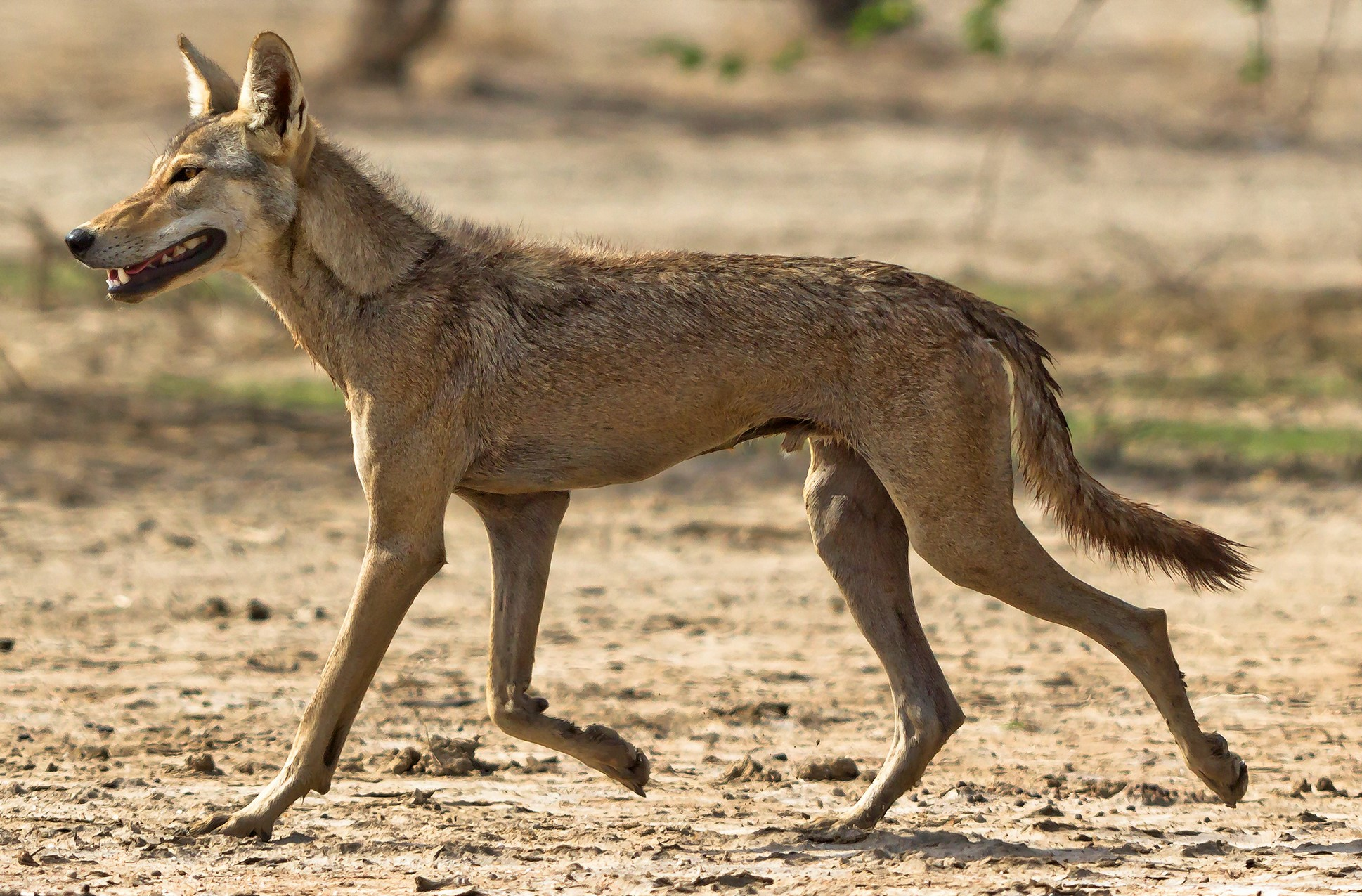
Indian wolf

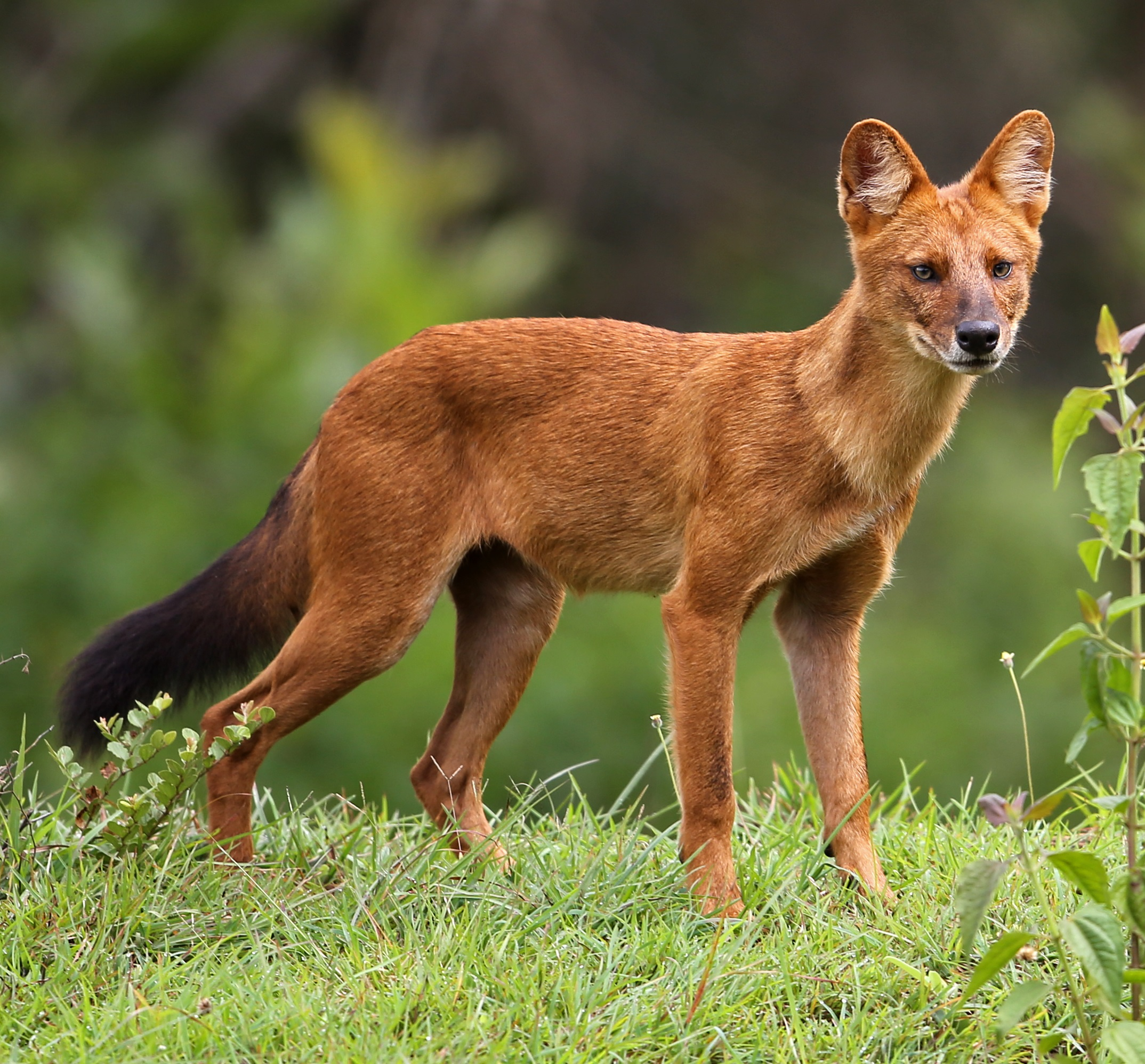
Dhole

- Golden jackal (Canis aureus) Linnaeus, 1758
- Wolf (Canis lupus) Linnaeus, 1758
  - Indian wolf (Canis lupus pallipes) Linnaeus, 1758
  - Himalayan wolf (Canis lupus chanco) Gray, 1863
- Dhole (Cuon alpinus) (Pallas, 1811)
- Red fox (Vulpes vulpes) Linnaeus, 1758
- Bengal fox (Vulpes bengalensis) (Shaw, 1800)
- Tibetan fox (Vulpes ferrilata) Hodgson, 1842

=== Family Felidae: cats ===
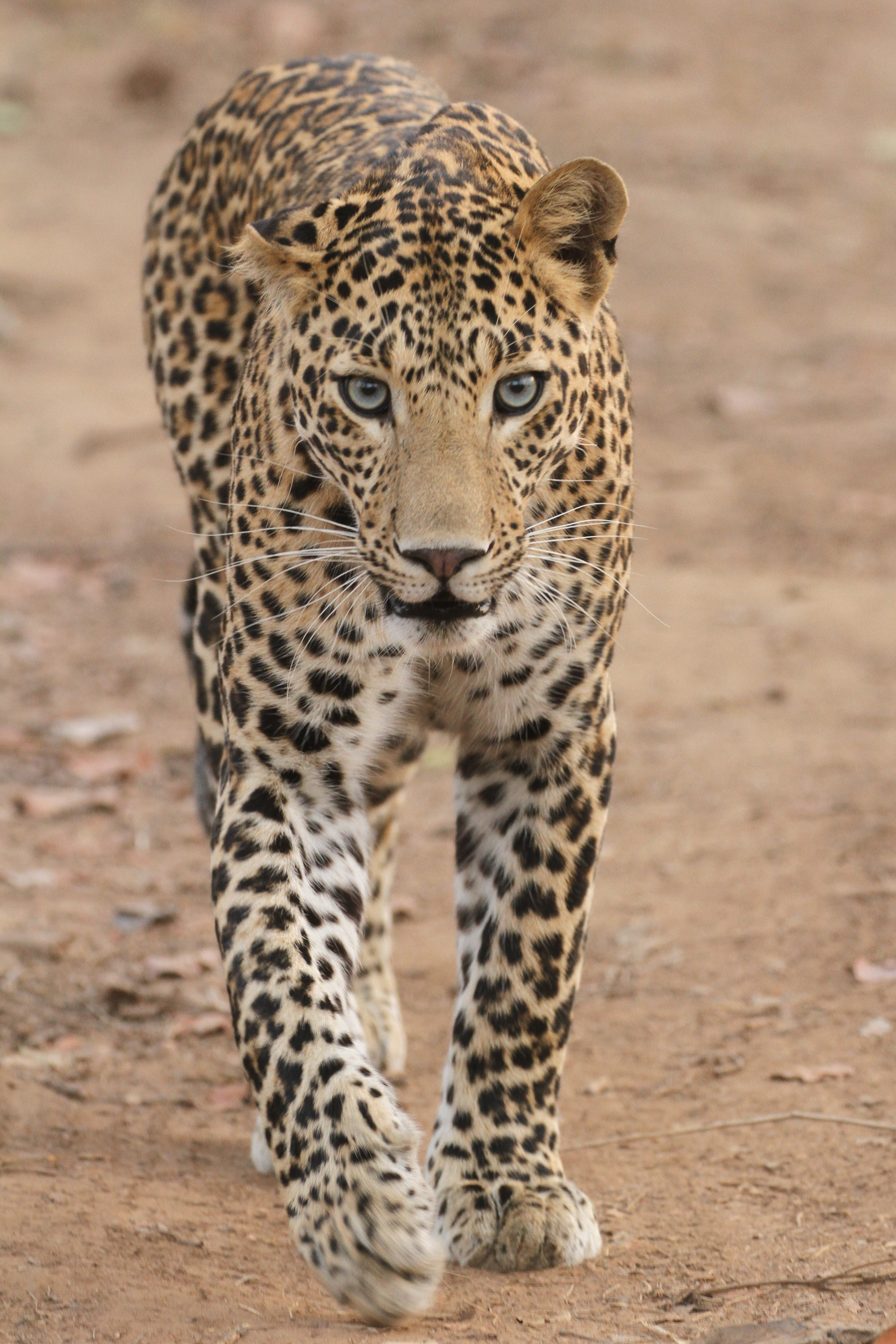
Indian leopard

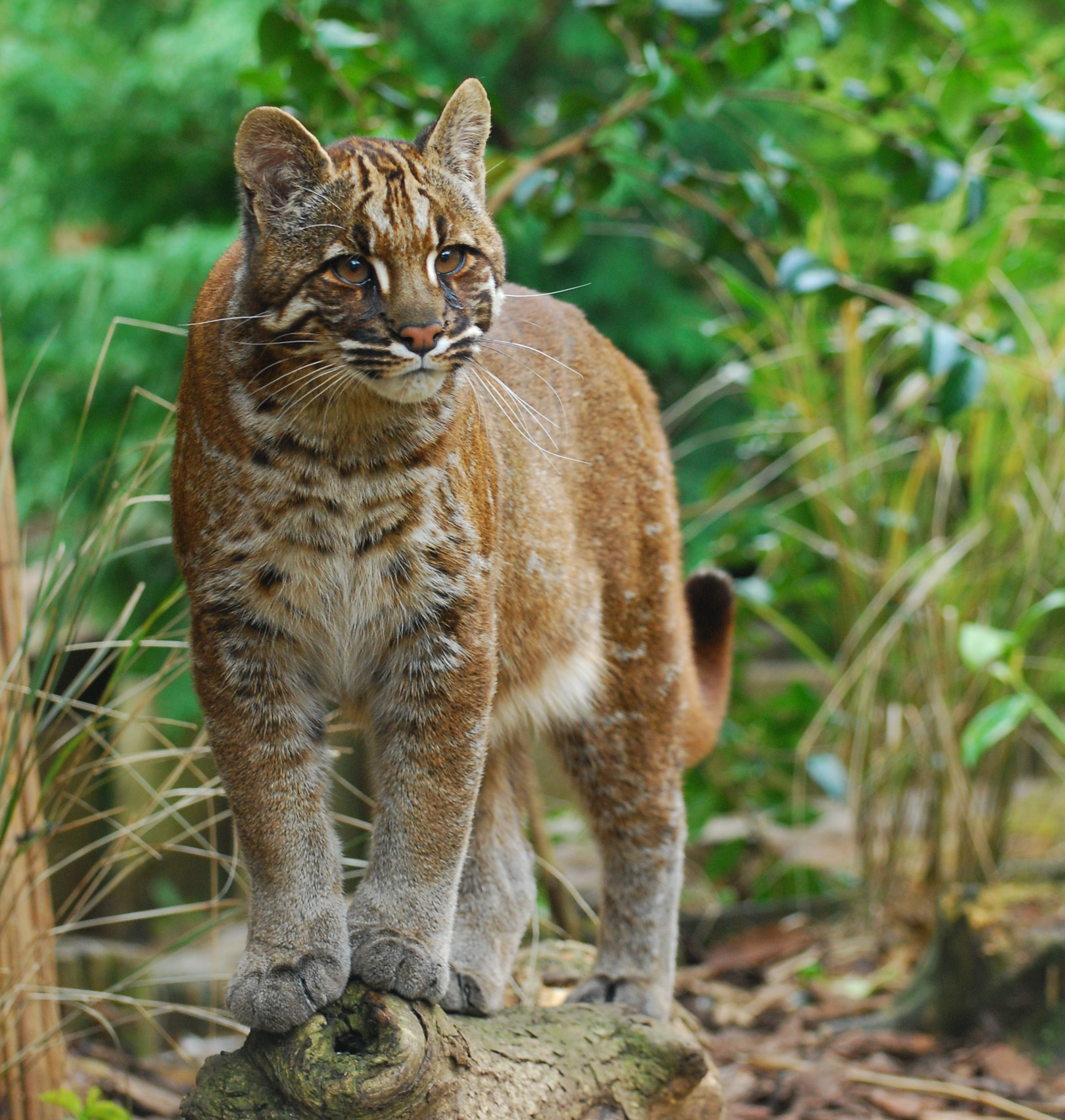
Asian golden cat

- Asian golden cat (Catopuma temminckii) (Vigors & Horsfield, 1827)
- Caracal (Caracal caracal) (Matschie, 1912)
- Cheetah (Acinonyx jubatus) reintroduction in progress
  - Southeast African cheetah (A. j. jubatus) introduction in progress
- Jungle cat (Felis chaus) Schreber, 1777
- Asiatic wildcat (Felis lybica ornata) Gray, 1830
- Eurasian lynx (Lynx lynx) (Blyth, 1847)
- Clouded leopard (Neofelis nebulosa) (Griffith, 1821)
- Pallas's cat (Otocolobus manul) (Pallas, 1776)
- Bengal tiger (Panthera tigris tigris) (Linnaeus, 1758)
- Asiatic lion (Panthera leo leo) (Linnaeus, 1758)
- Indian leopard (Panthera pardus fusca) (Linnaeus, 1758)
- Snow leopard (Panthera uncia) (Schreber, 1775)
- Marbled cat (Pardofelis marmorata) (Martin, 1837)
- Leopard cat (Prionailurus bengalensis) (Kerr, 1792)
- Rusty-spotted cat (Prionailurus rubiginosus) (I. Geoffroy Saint-Hilaire, 1831)
- Fishing cat (Prionailurus viverrina) (Bennett, 1833)

=== Family Viverridae: civets and palm civets ===
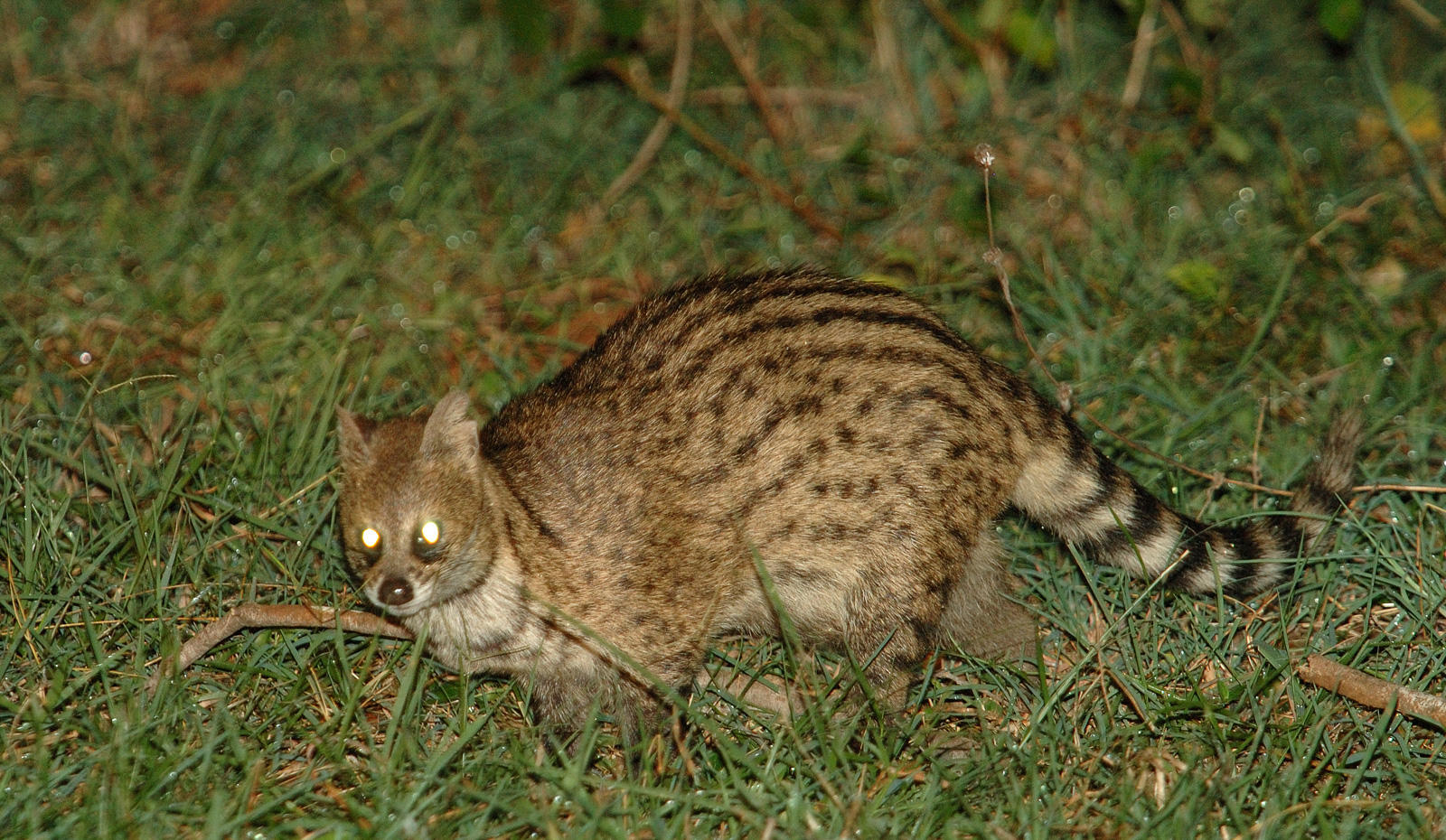
Small Indian civet

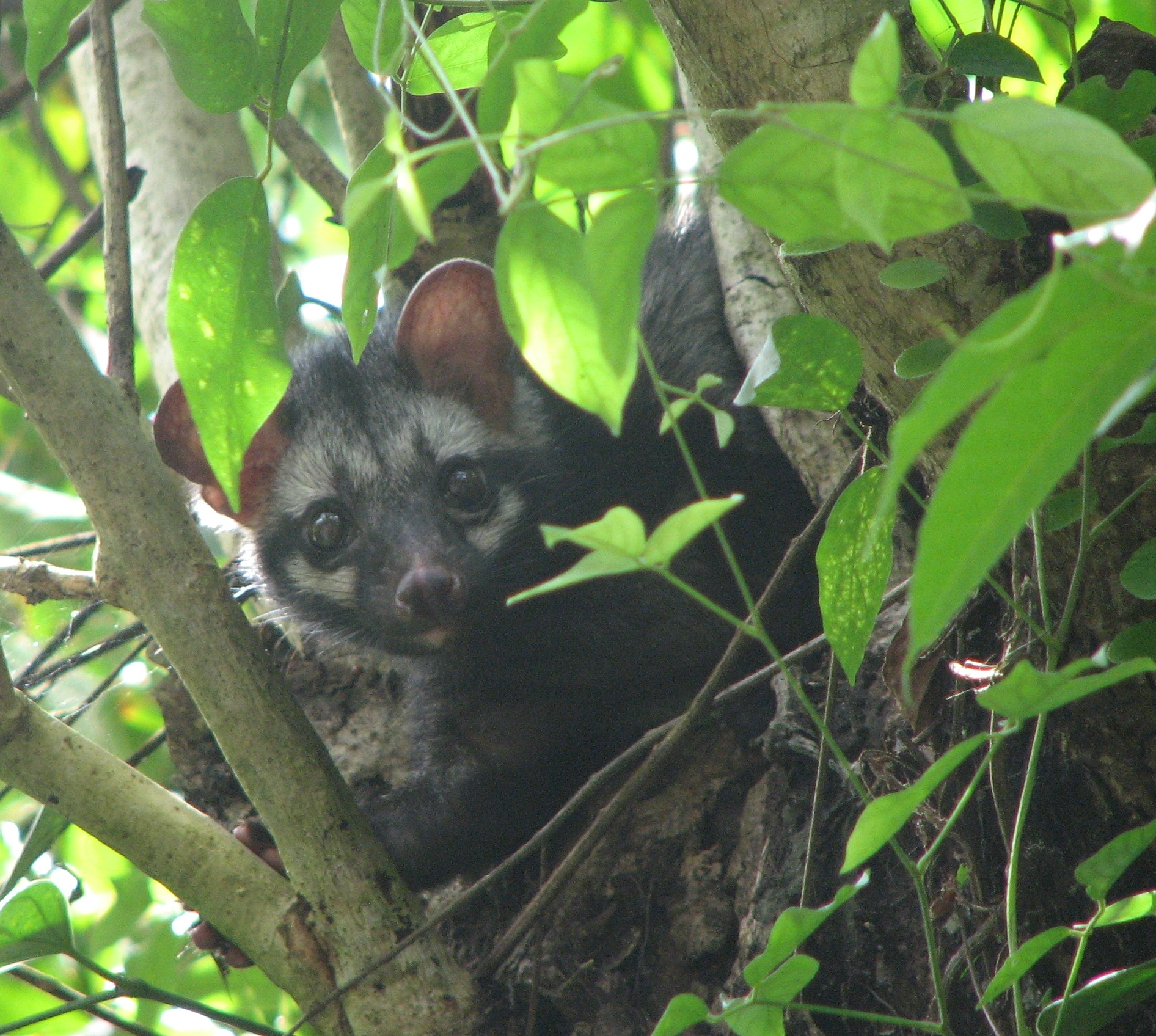
Asian palm civet

- Large Indian civet (Viverra zibetha) Linnaeus, 1758
- Malabar large-spotted civet (Viverra civettina) Blyth, 1862
- Small Indian civet (Viverricula indica) (Desmarest, 1804)
- Binturong (Arctictis binturong) (Raffles, 1821)
- Asian palm civet (Paradoxurus hermaphroditus) (Pallas, 1777)
- Masked palm civet (Paguma larvata) (Hamilton Smith, 1827)
- Brown palm civet (Paradoxurus jerdoni) Blanford, 1885
- Small-toothed palm civet (Arctogalidia trivirgata) (Gray, 1832)

=== Family Prionodontidae: Asiatic linsangs ===
- Spotted linsang (Prionodon pardicolor) Hodgson, 1842

=== Family Ursidae: bears ===
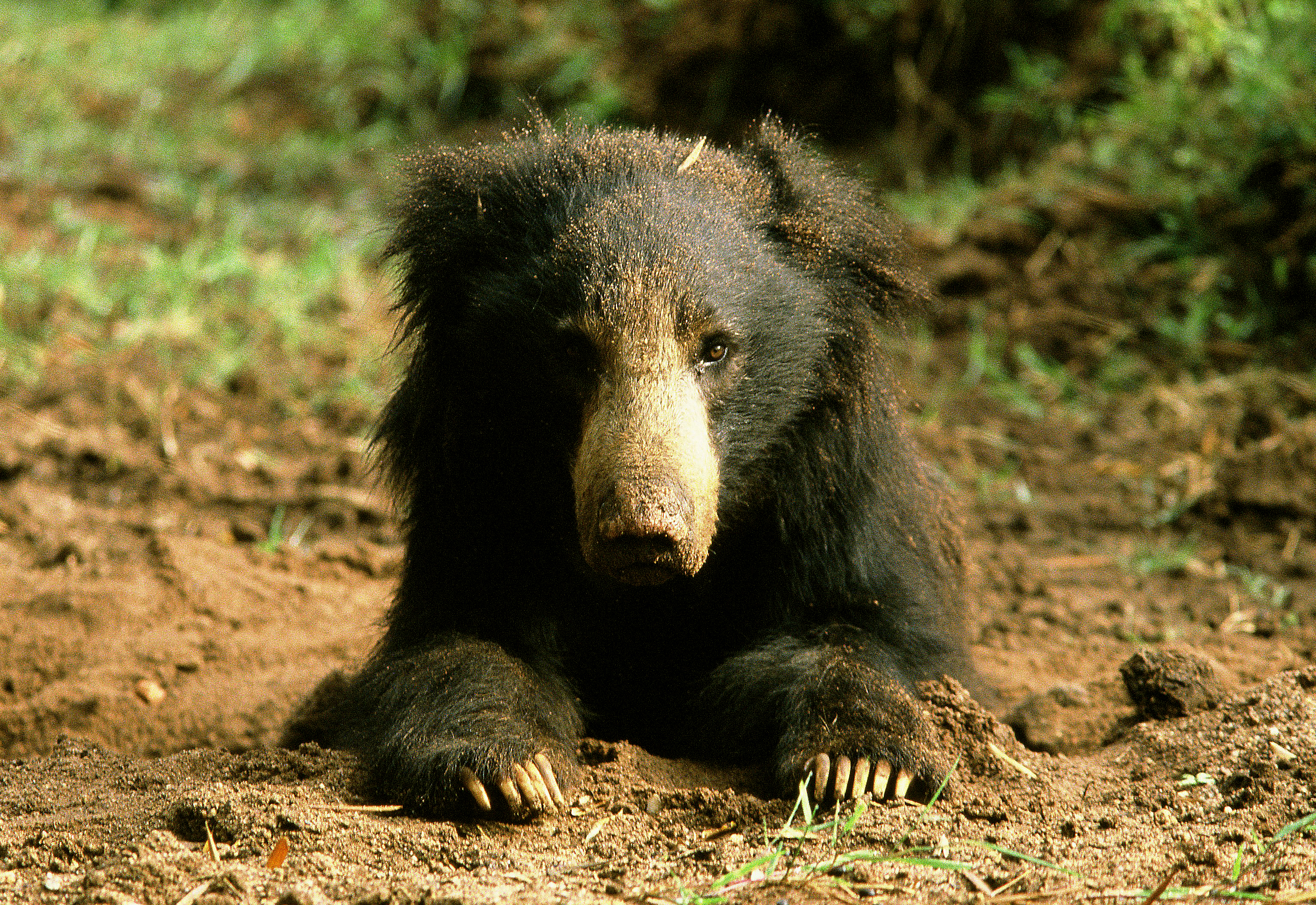
Sloth bear

- Sun bear (Helarctos malayanus) (Raffles, 1821)
- Sloth bear (Melursus ursinus) (Shaw, 1791)
- Tibetan blue bear (Ursus arctos pruinosus) Blyth, 1854
- Himalayan brown bear (Ursus arctos isabellinus) Linnaeus, 1758
- Himalayan black bear (Ursus thibetanus laniger) G. Cuvier, 1823

=== Family Ailuridae: red pandas ===
- Red panda, A. fulgens (F. Cuvier, 1825)

=== Family Mustelidae: mustelids ===
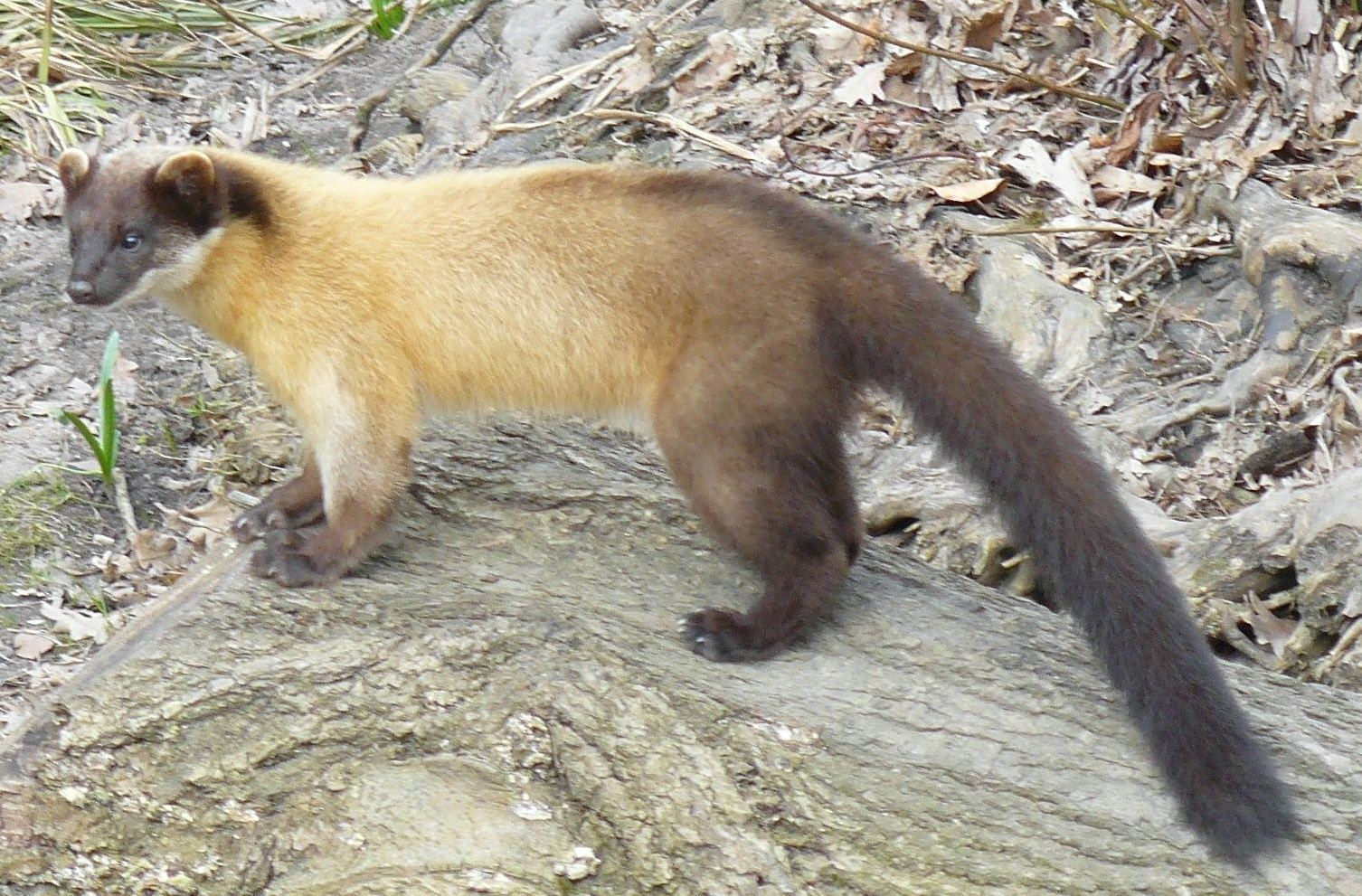
Yellow-throated marten

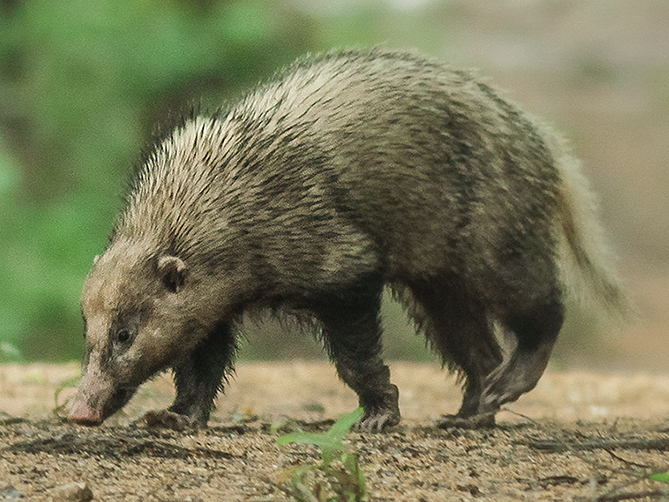
Greater hog badger

- Oriental small-clawed otter (Aonyx cinereus) Illiger, 1815
- Greater hog badger (Arctonyx collaris) Cuvier, 1825
- Northern hog badger (Arctonyx albogularis) Blyth, 1853
- Eurasian otter (Lutra lutra) (Linnaeus, 1758)
- Hairy-nosed otter (Lutra sumatrana) (Gray, 1865) extirpated
- Smooth-coated otter (Lutrogale perspicillata) (I. Geoffroy Saint-Hilaire, 1826)
- Yellow-throated marten (Martes flavigula) (Boddaert, 1785)
- Beech marten (Martes foina) (Erxleben, 1777)
- Nilgiri marten (Martes gwatkinsii) Horsfield, 1851
- Honey badger (Mellivora capensis) (Schreber, 1776)
- Chinese ferret badger (Melogale moschata) (Gray, 1831)
- Burmese ferret badger (Melogale personata) Geoffroy, 1831
- Mountain weasel (Mustela altaica) Pallas, 1811
- Stoat (Mustela erminea) Linnaeus, 1758
- Steppe polecat (Mustela eversmanii) (Lesson, 1827) presence uncertain
- Yellow-bellied weasel (Mustela kathiah) Hodgson, 1835
- Siberian weasel (Mustela sibirica) Pallas, 1773
- Back-striped weasel (Mustela strigidorsa) Gray, 1855

=== Family Herpestidae: mongooses ===
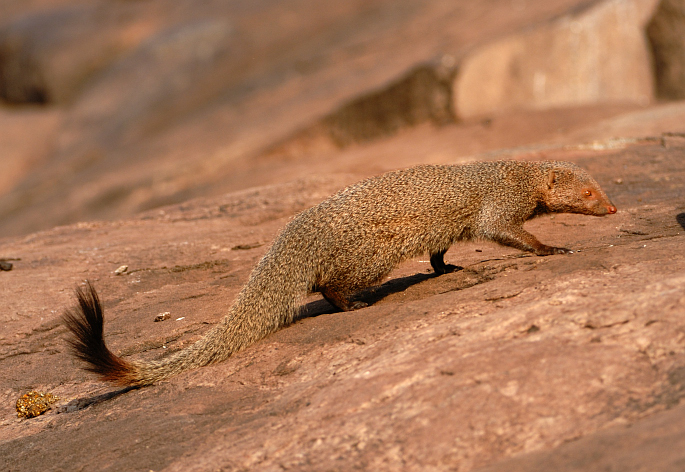
Ruddy mongoose

- Small Indian mongoose, (U. auropunctata) (Hodgson, 1836)
- Indian grey mongoose (U. edwardsii) (E. Geoffroy Saint-Hilaire, 1818)
- Striped-necked mongoose (U. vitticolla) Bennett, 1835
- Crab-eating mongoose (U. urva) (Hodgson, 1836)
- Ruddy mongoose (U. smithii) Gray, 1837
- Indian brown mongoose (U. fusca) Waterhouse, 1838

=== Family Hyaenidae: hyenas ===
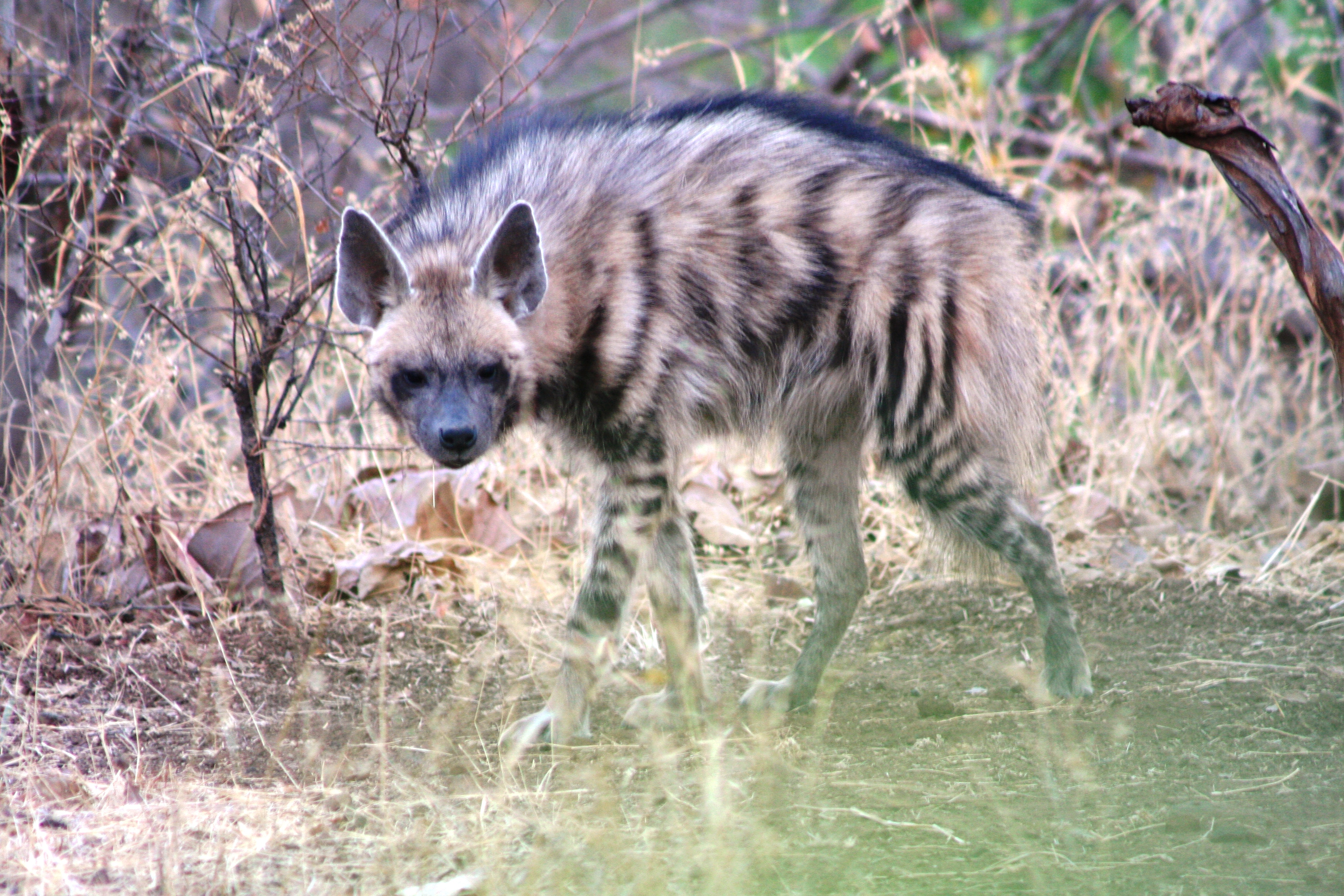
Striped hyena in Gujarat

- Striped hyena (Hyaena hyaena) (Linnaeus, 1758)

== Order: Cetacea: whales, dolphins, and porpoises ==
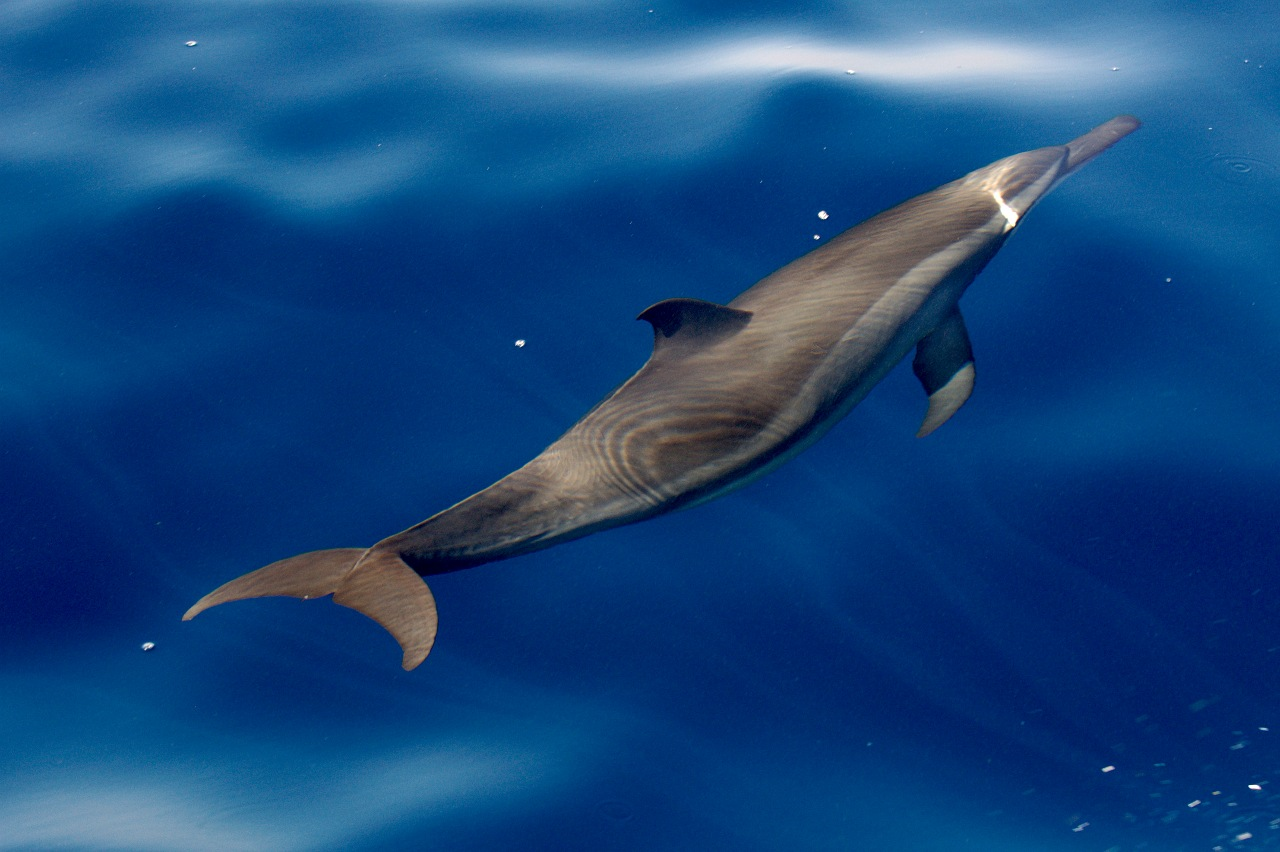
Spinner dolphin in the Bay of Bengal

=== Family Delphinidae ===
- Short-beaked common dolphin (Delphinus delphis) Linnaeus, 1758
- Short-finned pilot whale (Globicephala macrorhynchus) Gray, 1846
- Risso's dolphin (Grampus griseus) (G. Cuvier, 1812)
- Irrawaddy dolphin (Orcaella brevirostris) (Gray, 1866)
- Killer whale (Orcinus orca) (Linnaeus, 1758)
- Melon-headed whale (Peponocephala electra) (Gray, 1846)
- False killer whale (Pseudorca crassidens) (Owen, 1846)
- Pygmy killer whale (Feresa attenuata) Gray, 1875
- Indo-Pacific humpback dolphin (Sousa chinensis) (Osbeck, 1765)
- Spinner dolphin (Stenella longirostris) (Gray, 1828)
- Common bottlenose dolphin (Tursiops truncatus) (Montagu, 1821)
- Indo-Pacific bottlenose dolphin (Tursiops aduncus) (Ehrenberg, 1833)
- Fraser's dolphin (Lagenodelphis hosei) Fraser, 1957
- Pantropical spotted dolphin (Stenella attenuata) (Gray, 1846)
- Striped dolphin (Stenella coeruleoalba) (Meyen, 1833)
- Rough-toothed dolphin (Steno bredanensis) (Lesson, 1828)

=== Family Platanistidae: river dolphins ===
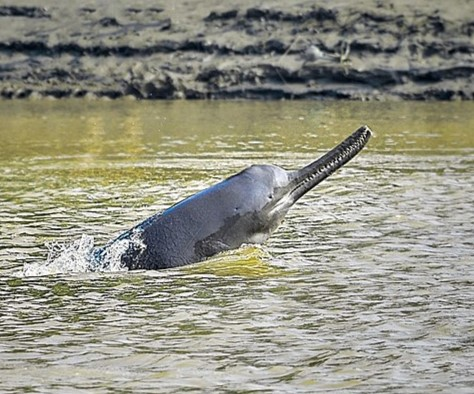
Ganges river dolphin

Indus river dolphin

- Ganges river dolphin (Platanista gangetica) (Lebeck, 1801)
- Indus river dolphin (Platanista minor) Owen, 1853

=== Family Balaenopteridae ===
- Common minke whale (Balaenoptera acutorostrata) Lacépède, 1804
- Sei whale (Balaenoptera borealis) (Lesson, 1828)
- Bryde's whale (Balaenoptera edeni) (Anderson, 1879)
- Blue whale (Balaenoptera musculus) (Linnaeus, 1758)
- Fin whale (Balaenoptera physalus) (Linnaeus, 1758)
- Humpback whale (Megaptera novaeangliae) (Borowski, 1781)

=== Family Balaenidae ===
- Southern right whale (Eubalaena australis) (Desmoulins, 1822) evidence unclear

=== Family Ziphiidae ===
- Cuvier's beaked whale (Ziphius cavirostris) (Blainville, 1817)
- Blainville's beaked whale (Mesoplodon densirostris) (Blainville, 1817)
- Ginkgo-toothed beaked whale (Mesoplodon ginkgodens) Nishiwaki & Kamiya, 1958

=== Family Phocoenidae ===
- Finless porpoise (Neophocaena phocaenoides) (G. Cuvier, 1829)

=== Family Kogiidae ===
- Pygmy sperm whale (Kogia breviceps) (Blainville, 1838)
- Dwarf sperm whale (Kogia sima) (Owen, 1866)

=== Family Physeteridae ===
- Sperm whale (Physeter macrocephalus) Linnaeus, 1758

== Order: Sirenia ==
=== Family Dugongidae ===
- Dugong (Dugong dugon) (Muller, 1776)

== Order: Proboscidea ==
=== Family Elephantidae: elephants ===
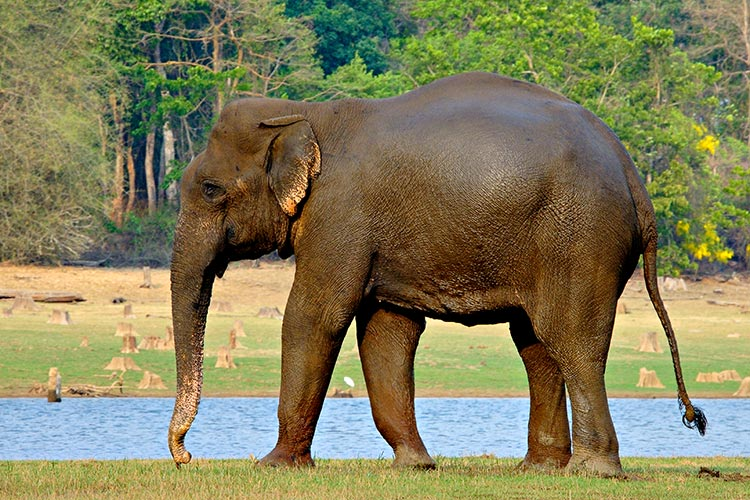
Indian elephant in Karnataka

- Indian elephant (Elephas maximus indicus) (Cuvier), 1798

== Order: Perissodactyla: odd-toed ungulates ==
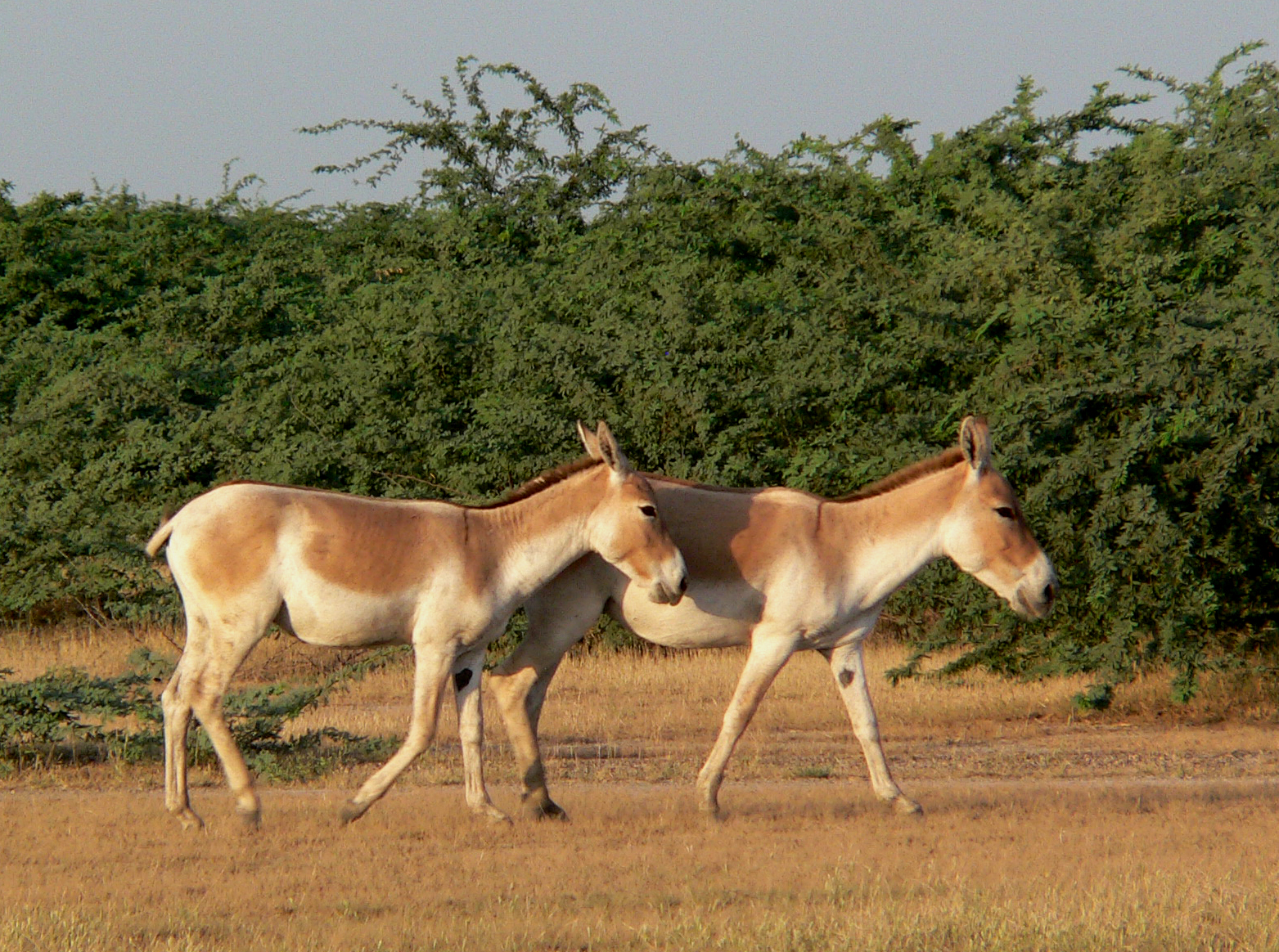
Indian wild ass in Little Rann of Kutch

=== Family Equidae: horses ===
- Indian wild ass (Equus hemionus khur) Corbet & Hill (1992)
- Kiang (Equus kiang) Moorcroft, 1841
- Feral horse

=== Family Rhinocerotidae: rhinoceroses ===
- Northern Sumatran rhinoceros, (Dicerorhinus sumatrensis lasiotis) locally extinct
- Javan rhinoceros, (Rhinoceros sondaicus) locally extinct
  - Lesser Javan rhinoceros, (Rhinoceros sondaicus inermis) EX
- Indian rhinoceros (Rhinoceros unicornis) Linnaeus, 1758

=== Family Tapiridae: tapirs ===
- Malayan tapir (Tapirus indicus) EN vagrant

== Order: Artiodactyla: even-toed ungulates ==
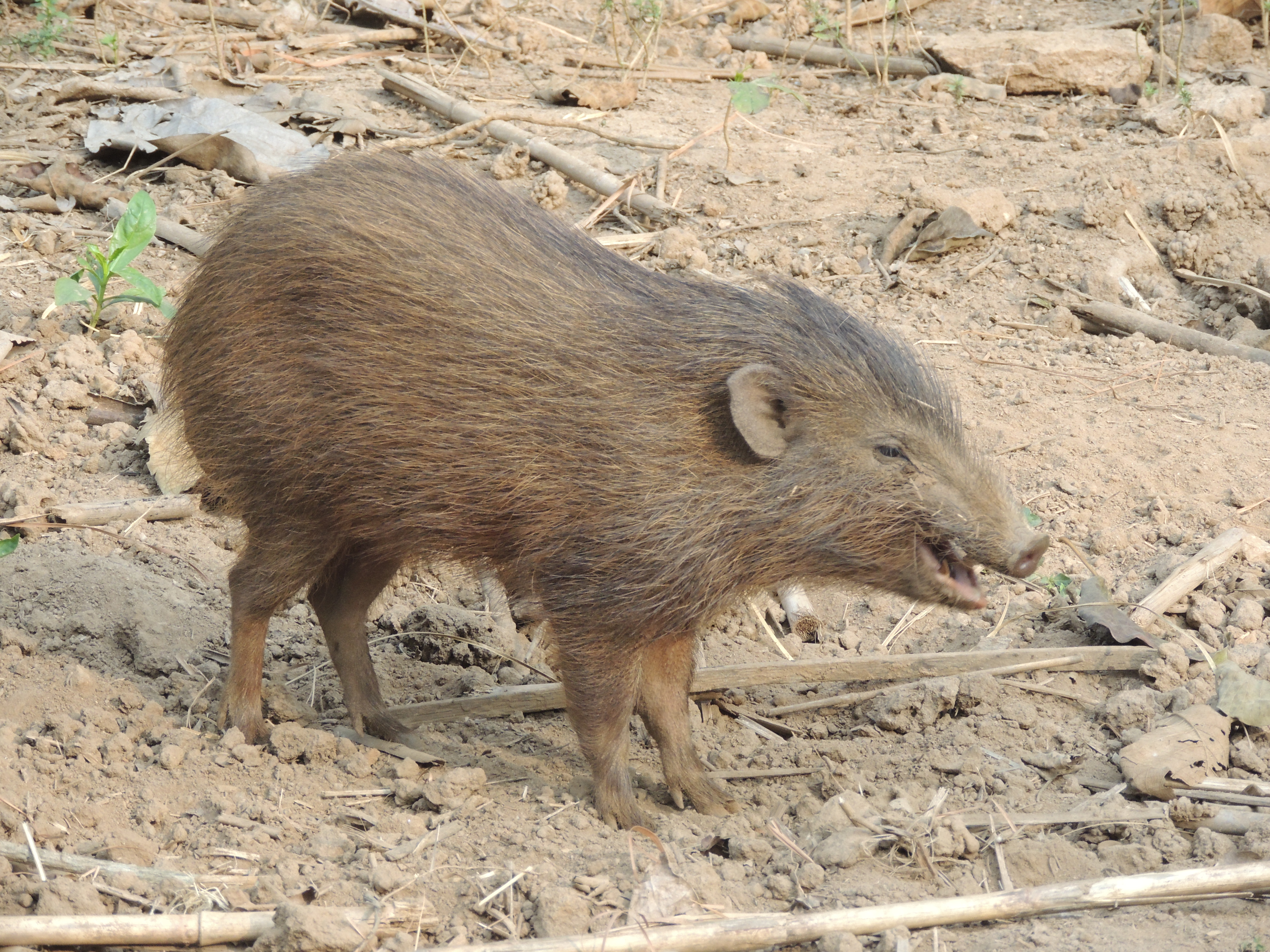
Pygmy hog in Assam breeding centre

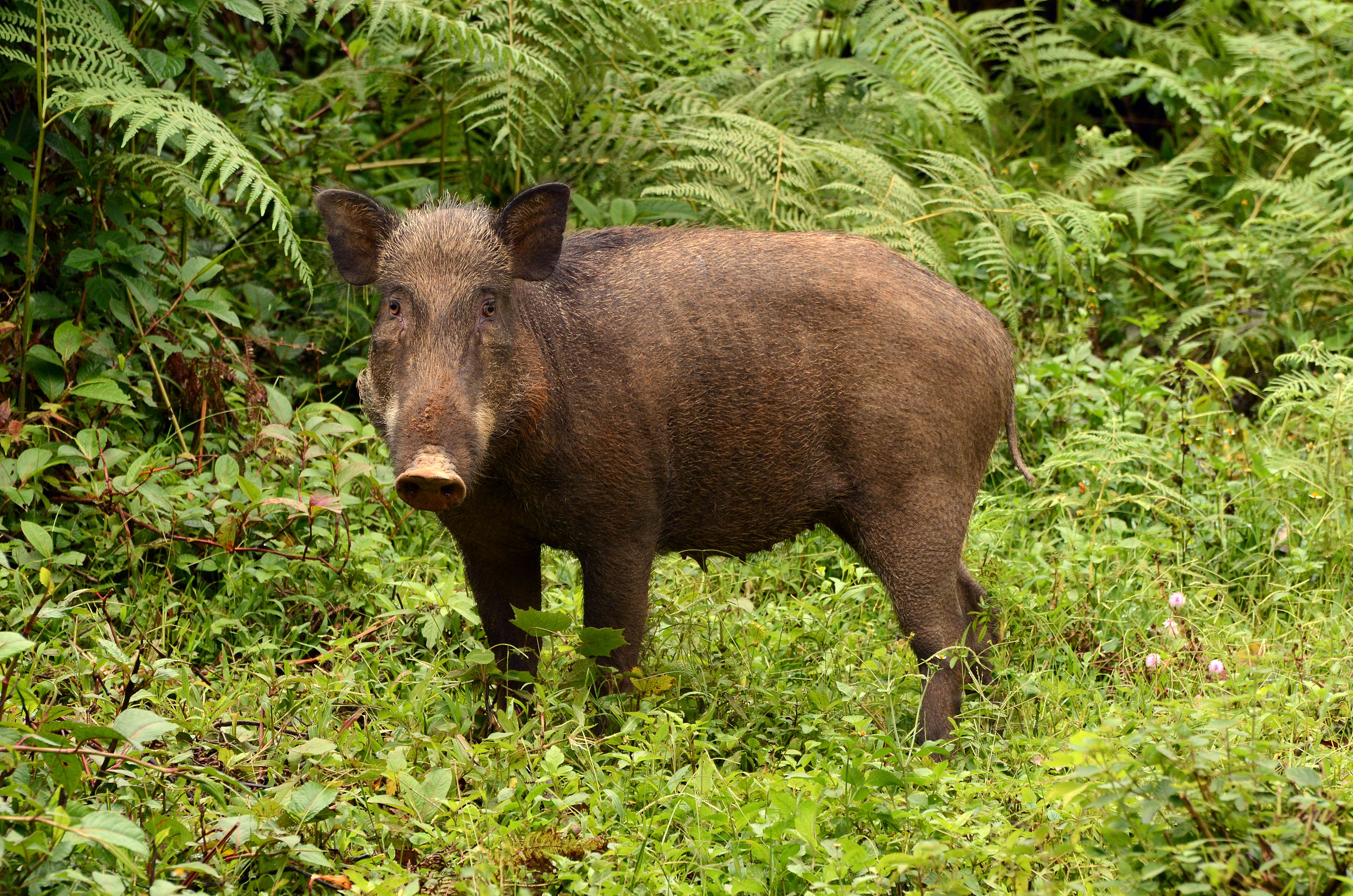
Indian boar in the Anaimalai Hills

=== Family Suidae: pigs ===
- Pygmy hog (Porcula salvania) (Hodgson, 1847) EN
- Indian boar (Sus scrofa cristatus) Wagner, 1839

=== Family Tragulidae: chevrotains ===
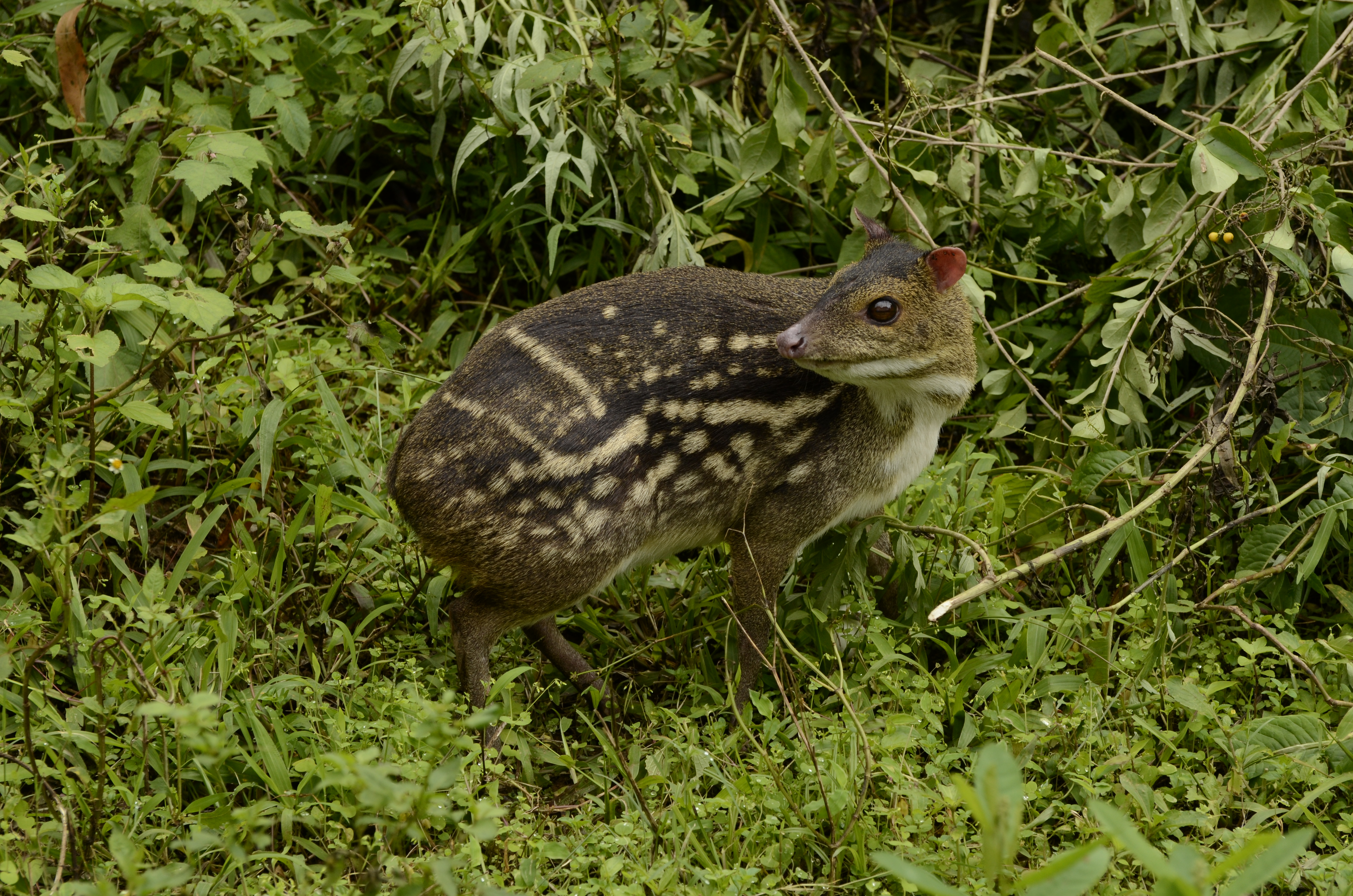
Indian spotted chevrotain in the Anaimalai Hills

- Indian spotted chevrotain (Moschiola indica) Gray, 1852

=== Family Moschidae ===
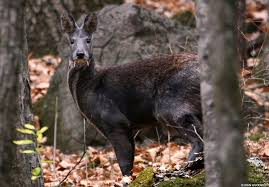
Kashmir musk deer

- Alpine musk deer (Moschus chrysogaster) (Hodgson, 1839)
- Black musk deer (Moschus fuscus) Li, 1981
- Himalayan musk deer (Moschus leucogaster)
- Kashmir musk deer (Moschus cupreus)

=== Family Cervidae: deer ===
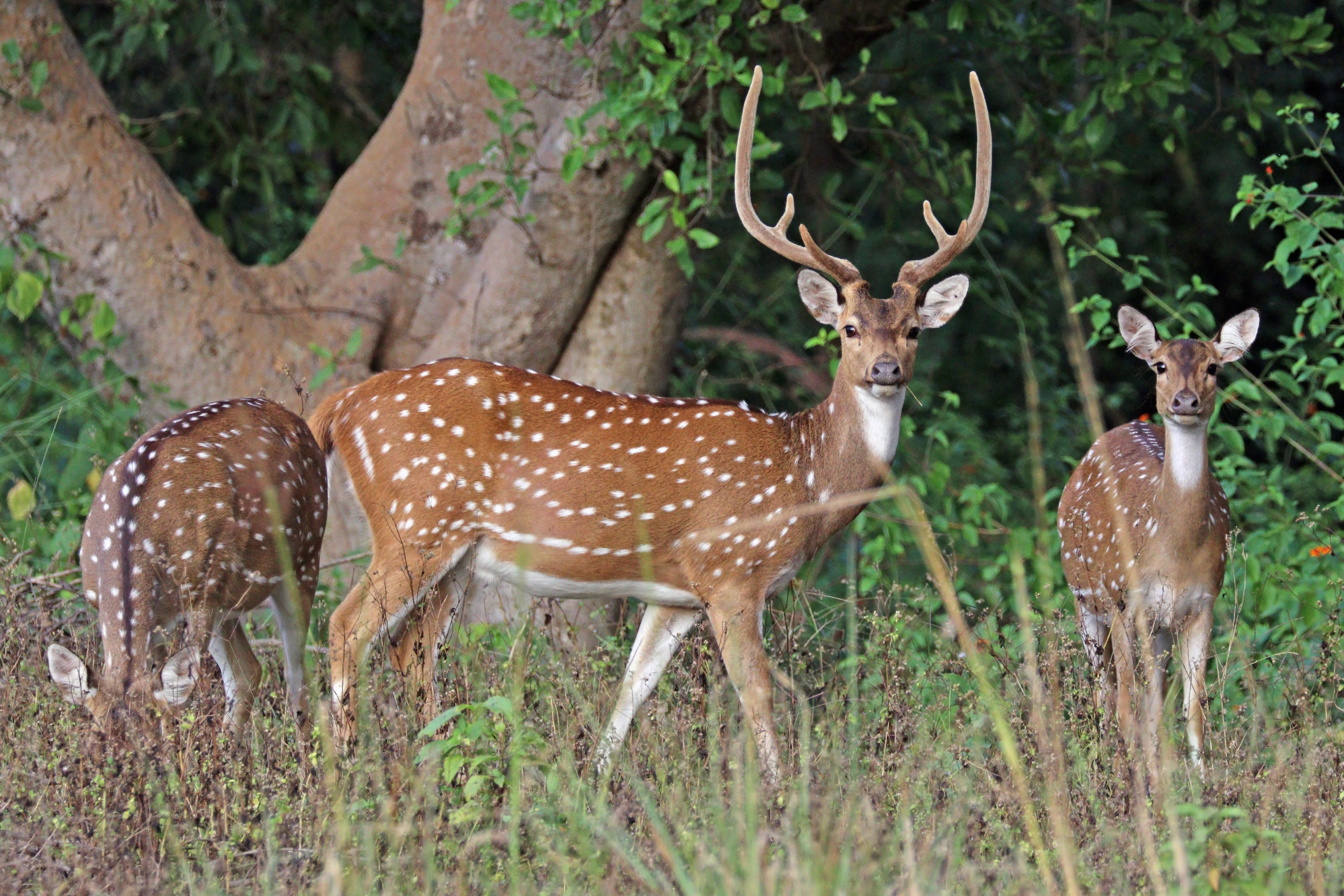
Male chital deer with two females in Kanha National Park

- Chital (Axis axis) (Erxleben, 1777)
- Indian hog deer (Axis porcinus) (Zimmermann, 1780)
- Central Asian red deer (Cervus hanglu) (Wagner, 1844)
  - Kashmir stag (C. h. hanglu) (Wagner, 1844)
- Indian muntjac (Muntiacus muntjak) (Zimmermann, 1780)
- Gongshan muntjac(Muntiacus gongshanensis)
- Leaf muntjac (Muntiacus putaoensis)
- Barasingha (Rucervus duvaucelii) G. Cuvier, 1823
- Eld's deer (Rucervus eldii) McClelland, 1842
- Sambar deer (Rusa unicolor) Kerr, 1792

=== Family Bovidae: bovids ===
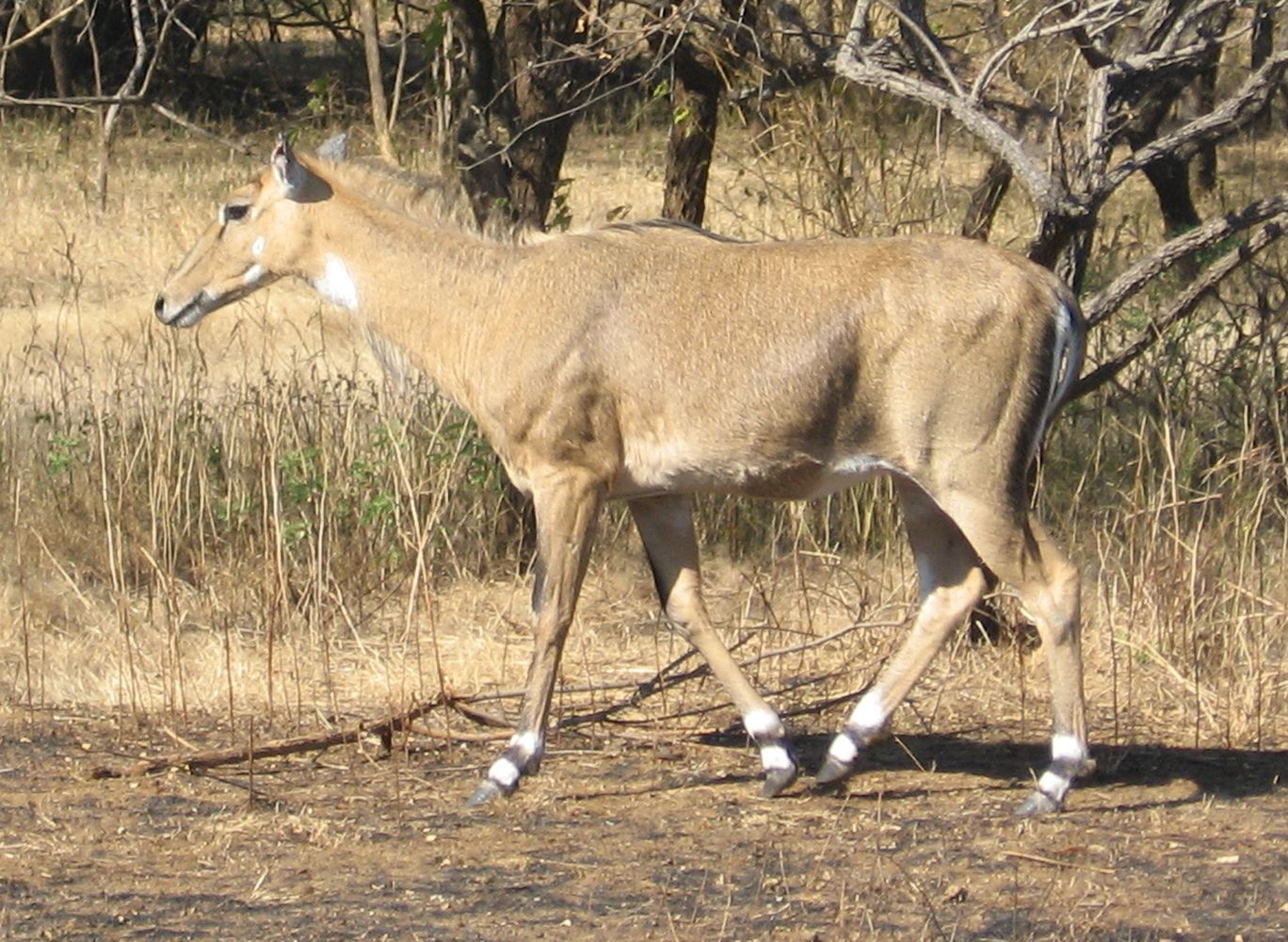
Female nilgai antelope at Gir National Park, Gujarat

Chinkara gazelle in Thar Desert, Rajasthan

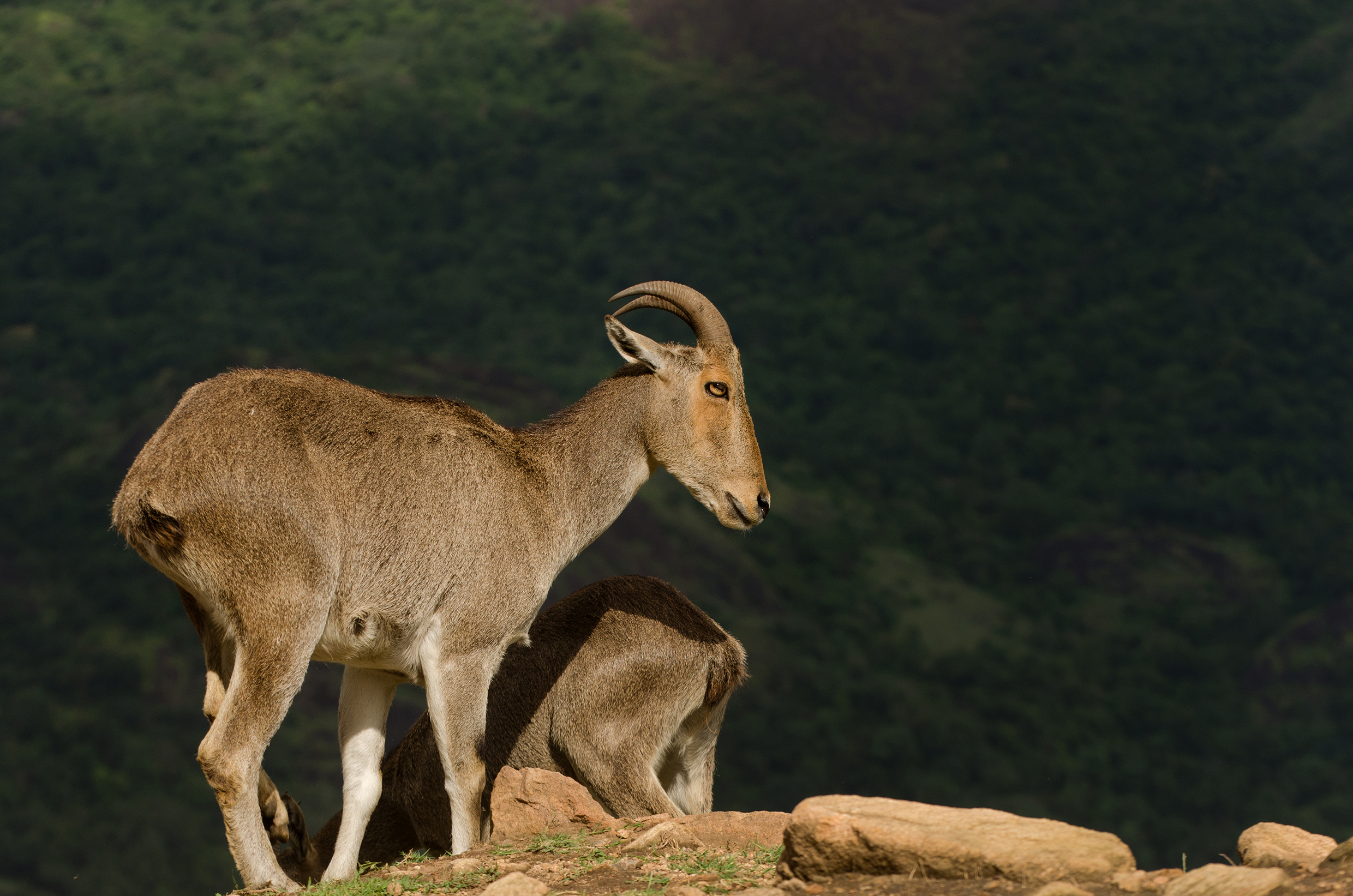
Nilgiri tahr

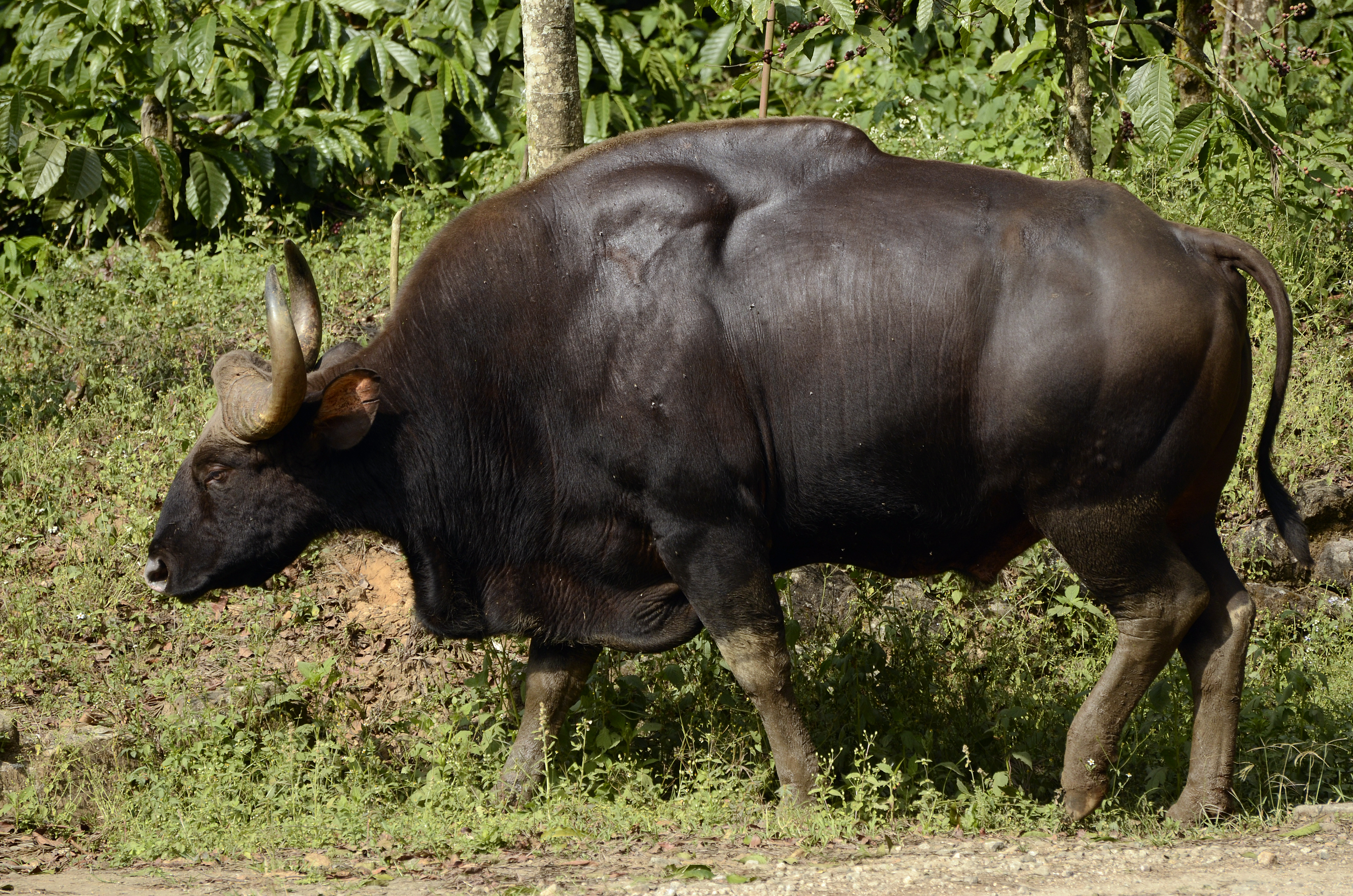
Gaur

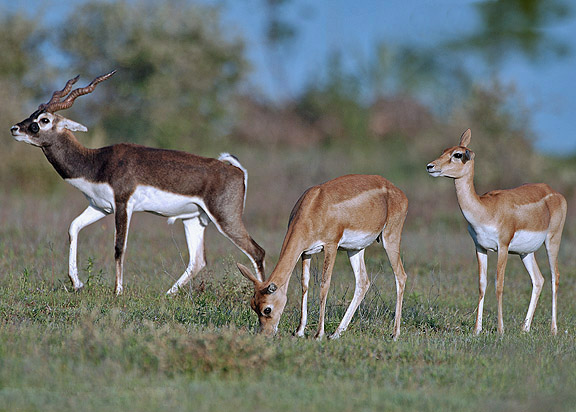
Blackbuck antelopes in Maharashtra

- Blackbuck (Antilope cervicapra) (Linnaeus, 1758)
- Gaur (Bos gaurus) Smith, 1827
- Banteng (Bos javanicus) d'Alton, 1823 extirpated
- Wild yak (Bos mutus) Przewalski, 1883
- Indian aurochs (Bos primigenius namadicus) (Falconer, 1859) extinct
- Nilgai (Boselaphus tragocamelus) (Pallas, 1766)
- Wild water buffalo (Bubalus arnee) Kerr, 1792
- Takin (Budorcas taxicolor) Hodgson, 1850
- Markhor (Capra falconeri) (Wagner, 1839)
- Siberian ibex (Capra sibirica) Pallas, 1776
- Mainland serow (Capricornis sumatraensis) Hodgson, 1831
- Chinkara (Gazella bennettii) (Sykes, 1831)
- Himalayan tahr (Hemitragus jemlahicus) (H. Smith, 1826)
- Red goral (Naemorhedus baileyi) Pocock, 1914
- Long-tailed goral (Naemorhedus caudatus) Milne-Edwards, 1867
- Himalayan goral (Naemorhedus goral) (Hardwicke, 1825)
- Nilgiri tahr (Nilgiritragus hylocrius) (Ogilby, 1838)
- Argali (Ovis ammon) (Linnaeus, 1766)
- Urial (Ovis vignei) Gmelin, 1774
- Tibetan antelope (Pantholops hodgsoni) (Abel, 1826)
- Tibetan gazelle (Procapra picticauda) Hodgson, 1846
- Bharal (Pseudois nayaur) (Hodgson, 1833)
- Four-horned antelope (Tetracerus quadricornis) (De Blainville, 1816)

== Order: Pholidota: pangolins ==
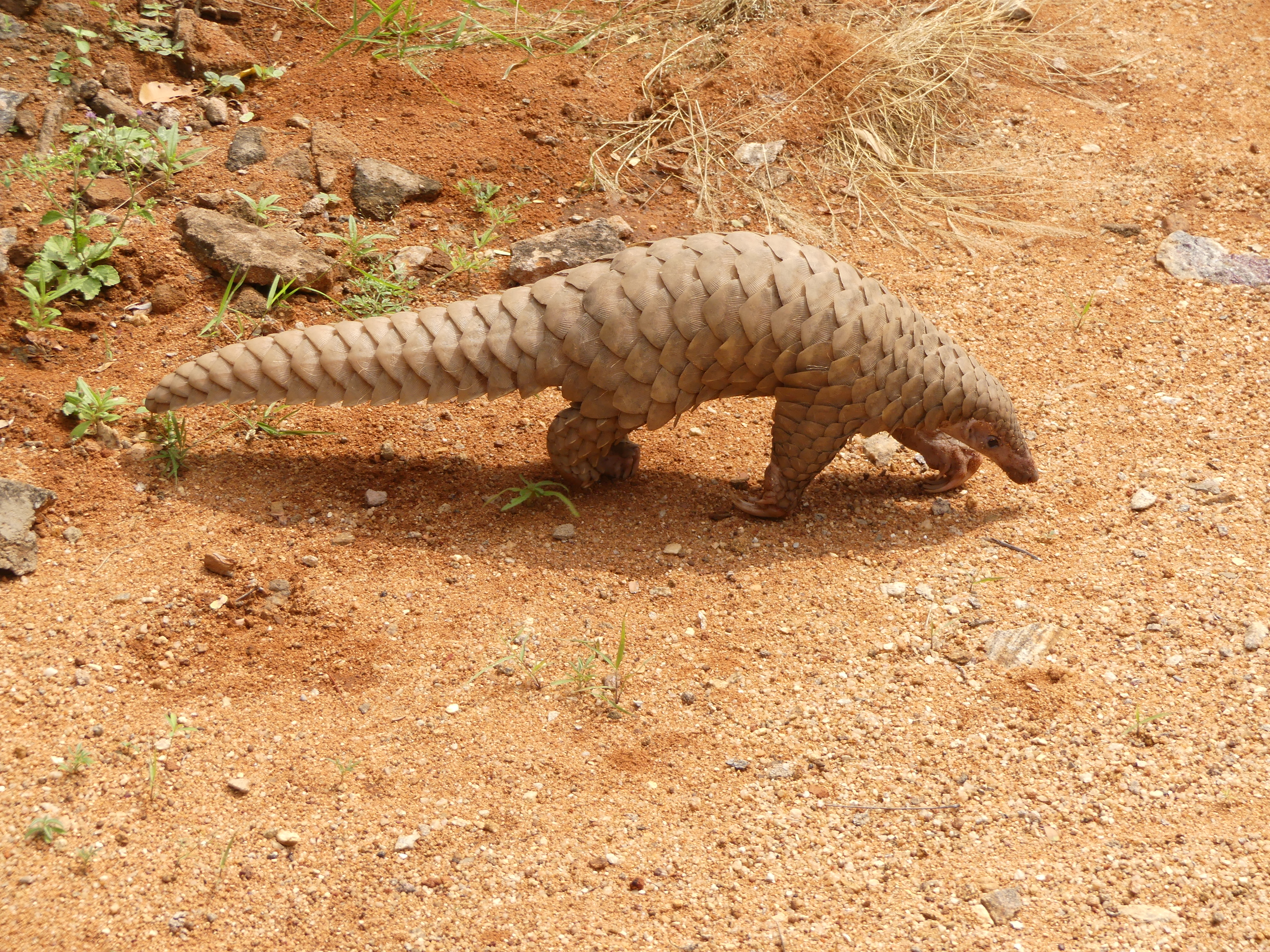
Indian pangolin in Kalakkad Mundanthurai Tiger Reserve

=== Family Manidae: pangolins ===
- Indian pangolin (Manis crassicaudata) Gray, 1827
- Chinese pangolin (Manis pentadactyla) Linnaeus, 1758
- Indo Burmese pangolin (Manis aurita) Hodgson, 1836

== Order: Rodentia ==
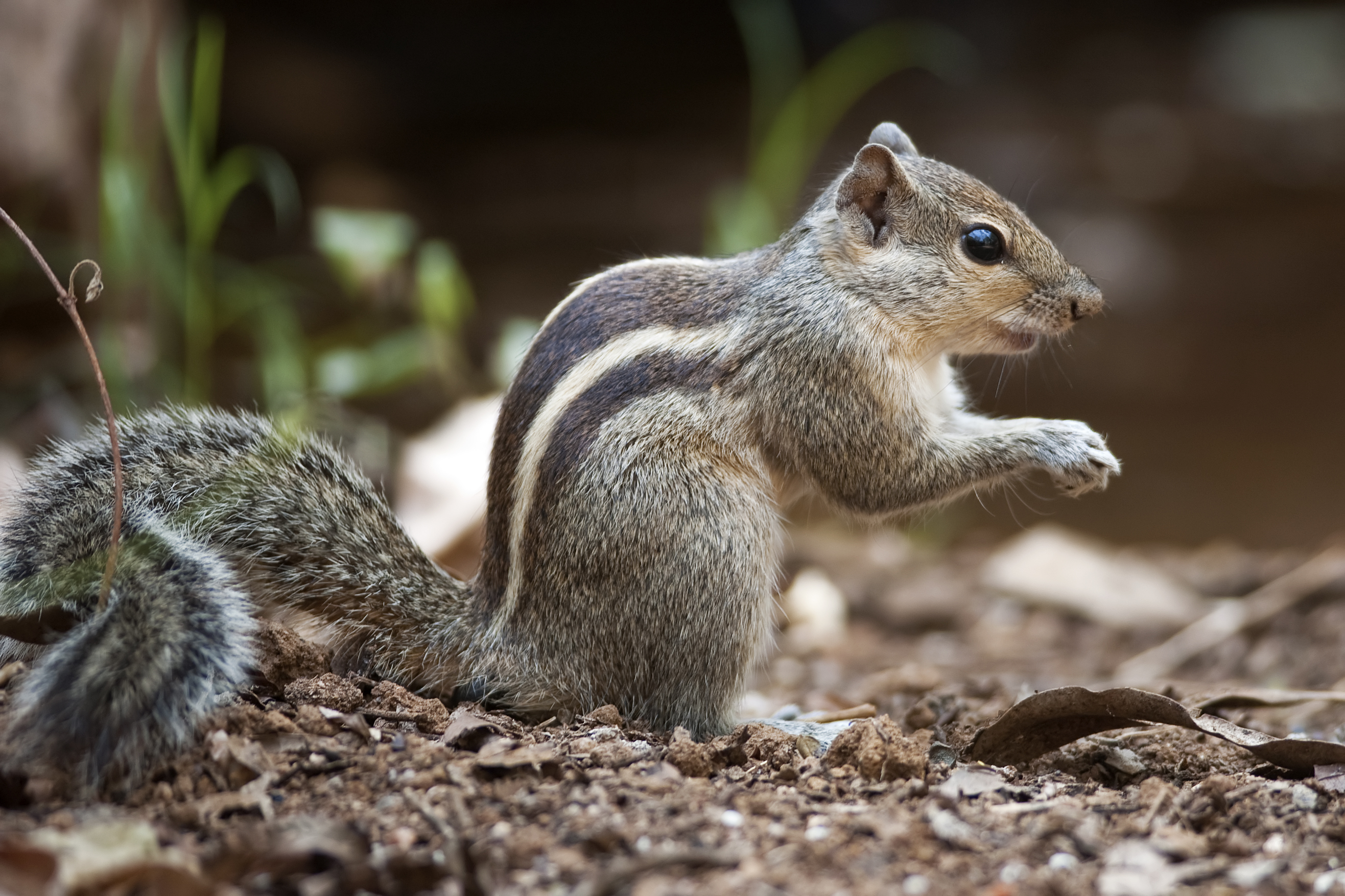
Indian palm squirrel in Bengaluru

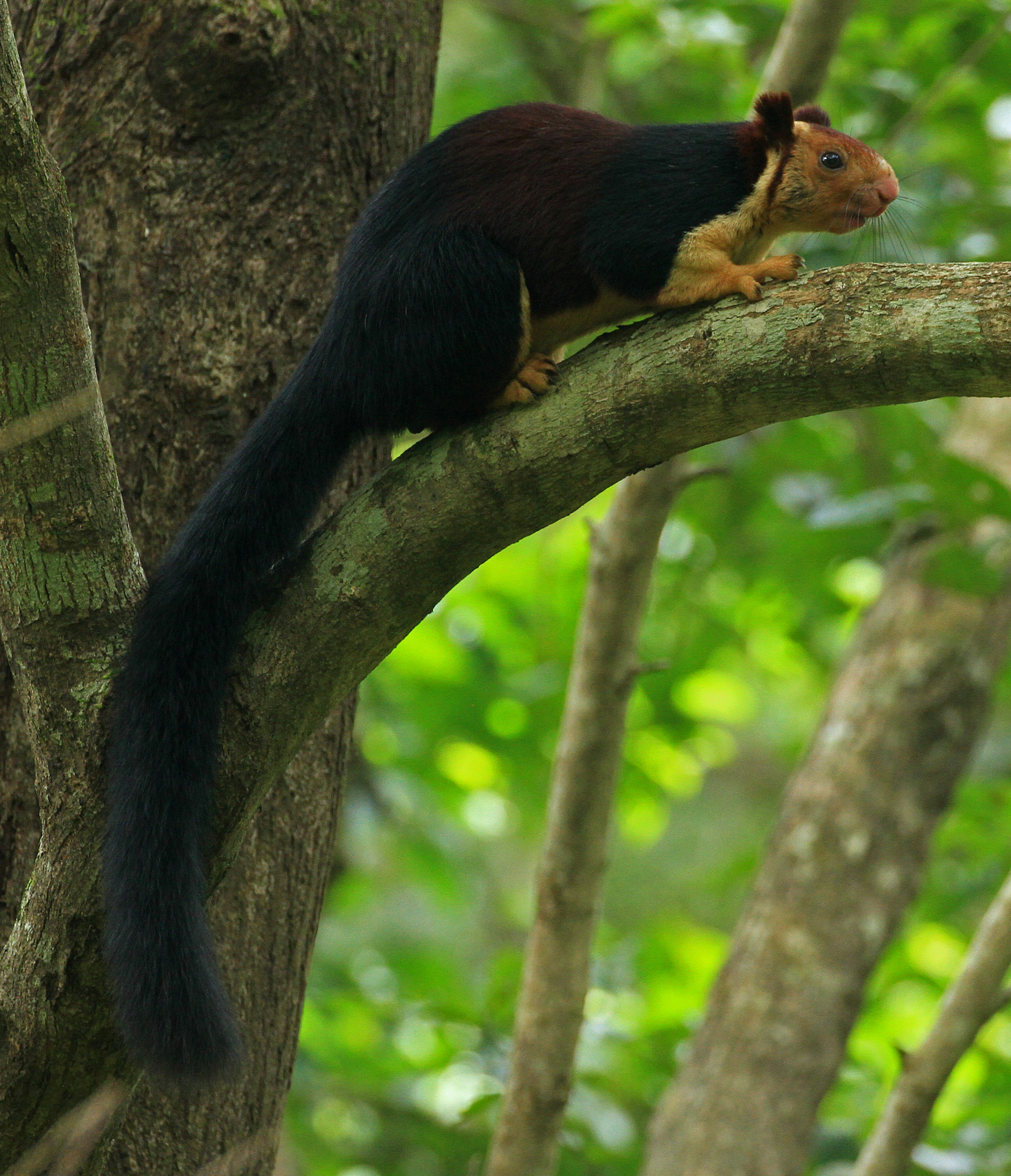
Indian giant squirrel in Kerala

=== Family Sciuridae: squirrels ===
- Hairy-footed flying squirrel (Belomys pearsonii) (Gray, 1842)
- Namdapha flying squirrel (Biswamoyopterus biswasi) Saha, 1981
- Pallas's squirrel (Callosciurus erythraeus) (Pallas, 1779)
- Irrawaddy squirrel (Callosciurus pygerythrus) (I. Geoffroy Saint Hilaire, 1831)
- Orange-bellied Himalayan squirrel (Dremomys lokriah) (Hodgson, 1863)
- Perny's long-nosed squirrel (Dremomys pernyi) (Milne-Edwards, 1867)
- Asian red-cheeked squirrel (Dremomys rufigenis) (Blanford, 1878)
- Western woolly flying squirrel (Eupetaurus cinereus) Thomas, 1888
- Tibetan woolly flying squirrel (Eupetaurus tibetensis) Jackson, Helgen, Q. Li & Jiang, 2021
- Particolored flying squirrel (Hylopetes alboniger) (Hodgson, 1836)
- Afghan flying squirrel (Hylopetes baberi) (Blyth, 1847)
- Kashmir flying squirrel (Hylopetes fimbriatus) (Gray, 1837)
- Layard's palm squirrel (Funambulus layardi) (Blyth, 1849)
- Indian palm squirrel (Funambulus palmarum) (Linnaeus, 1766)
- Jungle palm squirrel (Funambulus tristriatus) (Waterhouse, 1837) endemic
- Northern palm squirrel (Funambulus pennantii) Wroughton, 1905
- Nilgiri striped squirrel (Funambulus sublineatus) (Waterhouse, 1838)
- Himalayan marmot (Marmota himalayana) (Hodgson, 1841)
- Long-tailed marmot (Marmota caudata) (Geoffroy, 1844)
- Spotted giant flying squirrel (Petaurista elegans) (Muller, 1840)
- Hodgson's giant flying squirrel (Petaurista magnificus) (Hodgson, 1836)
- Bhutan giant flying squirrel (Petaurista nobilis) (Gray, 1842)
- Red giant flying squirrel (Petaurista petaurista) (Pallas, 1766)
- Indian giant flying squirrel (Petaurista philippensis) (Elliot, 1839)
- Mechuka giant flying squirrel (Petaurista mechukaensis) (Choudhury, 2007)
- Mishmi Hills giant flying squirrel (Petaurista mishmiensis) Choudhury, 2009
- Mebo giant flying squirrel, Petaurista siangensis Choudhury, 2013
- Travancore flying squirrel (Petinomys fuscocapillus) (Jerdon, 1847)
- Black giant squirrel (Ratufa bicolor gigantea) (Sparrman, 1778)
- Indian giant squirrel or Malabar giant (Ratufa indica) (Erxleben, 1777)
- Grizzled giant squirrel (Ratufa macroura) (Pennant, 1769)
- Himalayan striped squirrel (Tamiops mcclellandii) (Horsfield, 1840)

=== Family Muridae: Old World rats, mice ===
- South China field mouse (Apodemus draco) (Barrett-Hamilton, 1900)
- Sichuan field mouse (Apodemus latronum) (Corbet & Hill, 1992)
- Kashmir field mouse (Apodemus rusiges) Miller, 1913
- Wood mouse (Apodemus sylvaticus) (Linnaeus, 1758)
- Ward's field mouse (Apodemus wardi) (Wroughton, 1908)
- Lesser bandicoot rat (Bandicota bengalensis) (Gray & Hardwicke, 1833)
- Greater bandicoot rat (Bandicota indica) (Bechstein, 1800)
- Bower's white-toothed rat (Berylmys bowersi) (Anderson, 1879)
- Kenneth's white-toothed rat (Berylmys mackenziei) (Thomas, 1916)
- Manipur white-toothed rat (Berylmys manipulus) (Thomas, 1916)
- Indomalayan pencil-tailed tree mouse (Chiropodomys gliroides) (Blyth, 1856)
- Blanford's rat (Cremnomys blanfordi) (Thomas, 1881)
- Cutch rat (Cremnomys cutchicus) Wroughton, 1912
- Elvira rat (Cremnomys elvira) (Ellerman, 1946) known only from Kurumbapatti, Salem
- Millard's rat (Dacnomys millardi) Thomas, 1916
- Crump's mouse (Diomys crumpi) Thomas, 1917
- Edwards's long-tailed giant rat (Leopoldamys edwardsi) (Thomas, 1882)
- Sand-colored soft-furred rat (Millardia gleadowi) (Murray, 1886)
- Kondana soft-furred rat (Millardia kondana) Mishra & Dhanda, 1975
- Soft-furred rat or metad (Millardia meltada) (Gray, 1837)
- Manipur bush rat (Hadromys humei) (Thomas, 1886)
- Little Indian field mouse (Mus booduga) (Gray, 1837)
- Fawn-colored mouse (Mus cervicolor) Hodgson, 1845
- Cook's mouse (Mus cookii) Ryley, 1914
- Earth-colored mouse (Mus terricolor) Blyth, 1851
- Servant mouse (Mus famulus) Bonhote, 1898 endemic to the Western Ghats
- House mouse (Mus musculus) Linnaeus, 1758
- Gairdner's shrewmouse (Mus pahari) Thomas, 1916
- Phillips's mouse (Mus phillipsi) Wroughton, 1912
- Flat-haired mouse (Mus platythrix) Bennett, 1832 endemic
- Rock-loving mouse (Mus saxicola) Elliot, 1839
- Short-tailed bandicoot rat (Nesokia indica) (Gray & Hardwicke, 1830)
- Brahma white-bellied rat (Niviventer brahma) (Thomas, 1914)
- Smoke-bellied rat (Niviventer eha) (Wroughton, 1916)
- Chestnut white-bellied rat (Niviventer fulvescens) (Gray, 1847)
- Lang Bian white-bellied rat (Niviventer langbianis) (Robinson & Kloss, 1922)
- White-bellied rat (Niviventer niviventer) (Hodgson, 1836)
- Tenasserim white-bellied rat (Niviventer tenaster) (Thomas, 1916)
- Nonsense rat (Rattus burrus) (Miller, 1902) Nicobars
- Polynesian rat (Rattus exulans) (Peale, 1848)
- Himalayan field rat (Rattus nitidus) (Hodgson, 1845)
- Brown rat (Rattus norvegicus) (Berkenhout, 1769)
- Palm rat (Rattus palmarum) (Zelebor, 1869) (Nicobars)
- Kerala rat (Rattus ranjiniae) Agarwal & Ghosal, 1969 Western Ghats
- Black rat (Rattus rattus) (Linnaeus, 1758)
- Sikkim rat (Rattus andamanensis) (Blyth, 1860)
- Andaman rat (Rattus stoicus) (Miller, 1902)
- Malayan field rat (Rattus tiomanicus) (Miller, 1900)
- Turkestan rat (Rattus turkestanicus) (Satunin, 1903)
- Asiatic long-tailed climbing mouse (Vandeleuria oleracea) (Bennett, 1832)
- Nilgiri long-tailed tree mouse (Vandeleuria nilagirica) Jerdon, 1867
- Indian desert jird (Meriones hurrianae) Jerdon, 1867
- Eurasian harvest mouse (Micromys minutus) (Pallas, 1771)
- Tibetan dwarf hamster (Urocricetus alticola) Thomas, 1917
- Grey dwarf hamster (Nothocricetulus migratorius) (Pallas, 1773)
- Indian gerbil (Tatera indica) (Hardwicke, 1807)
- Indian hairy-footed gerbil (Gerbillus gleadowi) Murray, 1886
- Balochistan gerbil (Gerbillus nanus) Blanford, 1875
- Indian bush rat (Golunda ellioti) Gray, 1837
- Malabar spiny dormouse (Platacanthomys lasiurus) Blyth, 1859
- White-tailed mountain vole (Alticola albicauda) (True, 1894)
- Central Kashmir vole (Alticola montosa) (True, 1894)
- Royle's mountain vole (Alticola roylei) (Gray, 1842)
- Stolička's mountain vole (Alticola stoliczkanus) (Blanford, 1875)
- Silver mountain vole (Alticola argentatus) (Severtzov, 1879)
- Père David's vole (Eothenomys melanogaster) (Milne-Edwards, 1871)
- Murree vole (Hyperacrius wynnei) (Blanford, 1881)
- Blyth's vole (Microtus leucurus) (Blyth, 1863)
- True's vole (Hyperacrius fertilis) (True, 1894)
- Sikkim mountain vole (Microtus sikimensis) (Hodgson, 1849)
- Lesser bamboo rat (Cannomys badius) (Hodgson, 1841)
- Hoary bamboo rat (Rhizomys pruinosus) Blyth, 1851

=== Family Hystricidae: Old World porcupines ===
- Asiatic brush-tailed porcupine (Atherurus macrourus) (Linnaeus, 1758)
- Malayan porcupine (Hystrix brachyura) Linnaeus, 1758
- Indian crested porcupine (Hystrix indica) Kerr, 1792

== Order: Lagomorpha: hares, rabbits, pikas ==
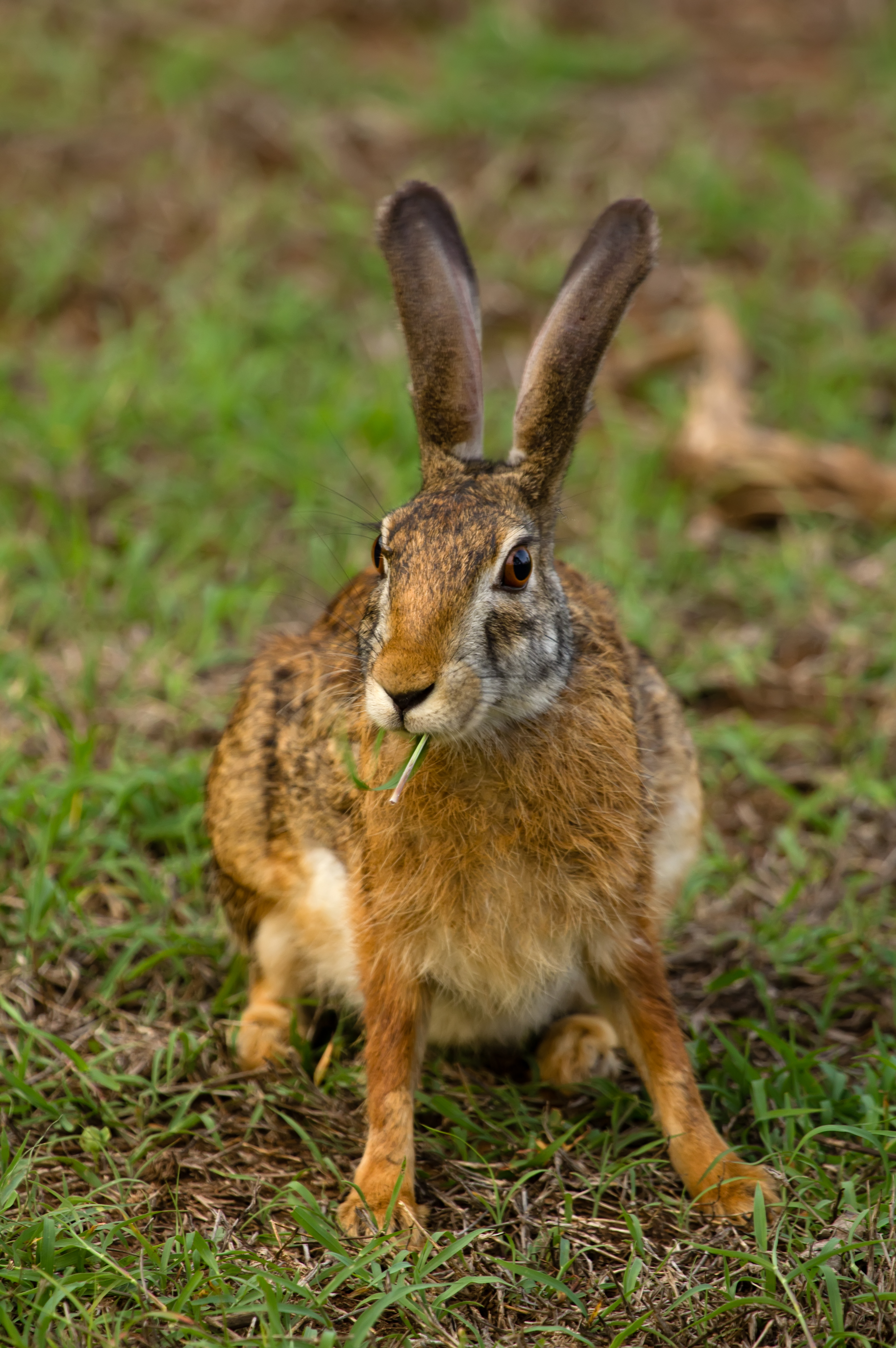
Indian hare at Bandipur National Park

=== Family Leporidae: hares and rabbits ===
- Hispid hare (Caprolagus hispidus) (Pearson, 1839)
- Cape hare (Lepus capensis) Linnaeus, 1758
- Indian hare (Lepus nigricollis) F. Cuvier, 1823
- Woolly hare (Lepus oiostolus) Hodgson, 1840
- Desert hare (Lepus tibetanus) Waterhouse, 1841

=== Family Ochotonidae: pikas ===
- Plateau pika (Ochotona curzoniae) (Hodgson, 1858)
- Forrest's pika (Ochotona forresti) Thomas, 1923
- Ladak pika (Ochotona ladacensis) (Gunther, 1875)
- Large-eared pika (Ochotona macrotis) (Gunther, 1875)
- Nubra pika (Ochotona nubrica) Thomas, 1922
- Royle's pika (Ochotona roylei) (Ogilby, 1839)
- Moupin pika (Ochotona thibetana) (Milne-Edwards, 1871)

== See also ==
- Fauna of India
- Lists of mammals by region
- List of mammals of Kerala

== Other references ==
- Corbet, G. B. & Hill, J. E. (1992). The Mammals of the Indomalayan Region: A Systematic Review. Oxford University Press.
- Ellerman, J. R. & Morrison-Scott, T. C. S. (1951). Checklist of Palaearctic and Indian Mammals 1758 to 1946. Trustees of the British Museum (Natural History), London
- Prater, S. H. (1971). The Book of Indian Animals. Oxford University Press. (Third edition 1997)
- Talmale, S. S.; Pradhan, M. S. (2009). A Checklist of Valid Indian Bat Species (Chiroptera: Mammalia) (PDF). Zoological Survey of India, Western Regional Centre, Pune, Maharashtra, PIN 411044.
- Nameer, P. O. (2000). "Checklist of Indian Mammals". Kerala Forest Department and Kerala Agricultural University. 90+xxv pp.
