= Homfray's horseshoe bat =

Scientific classification
- Kingdom: Animalia
- Phylum: Chordata
- Class: Mammalia
- Order: Chiroptera
- Family: Rhinolophidae
- Genus: Rhinolophus
- Species: R. andamanensis

Binomial name
- Rhinolophus andamanensis (Dobson, 1872)

Species of bat

Homfray's horseshoe bat (Rhinolophus andamanensis) is a species of bat in the family Rhinolophidae. It is endemic to the Andaman Islands.

It is a medium-sized bat, with forearms of 46.7–56.6 mm. It was previously considered a subspecies of the intermediate horseshoe bat (R. affinis), from which it was separated based on morphometric, acoustic and molecular phylogeny criteria.
