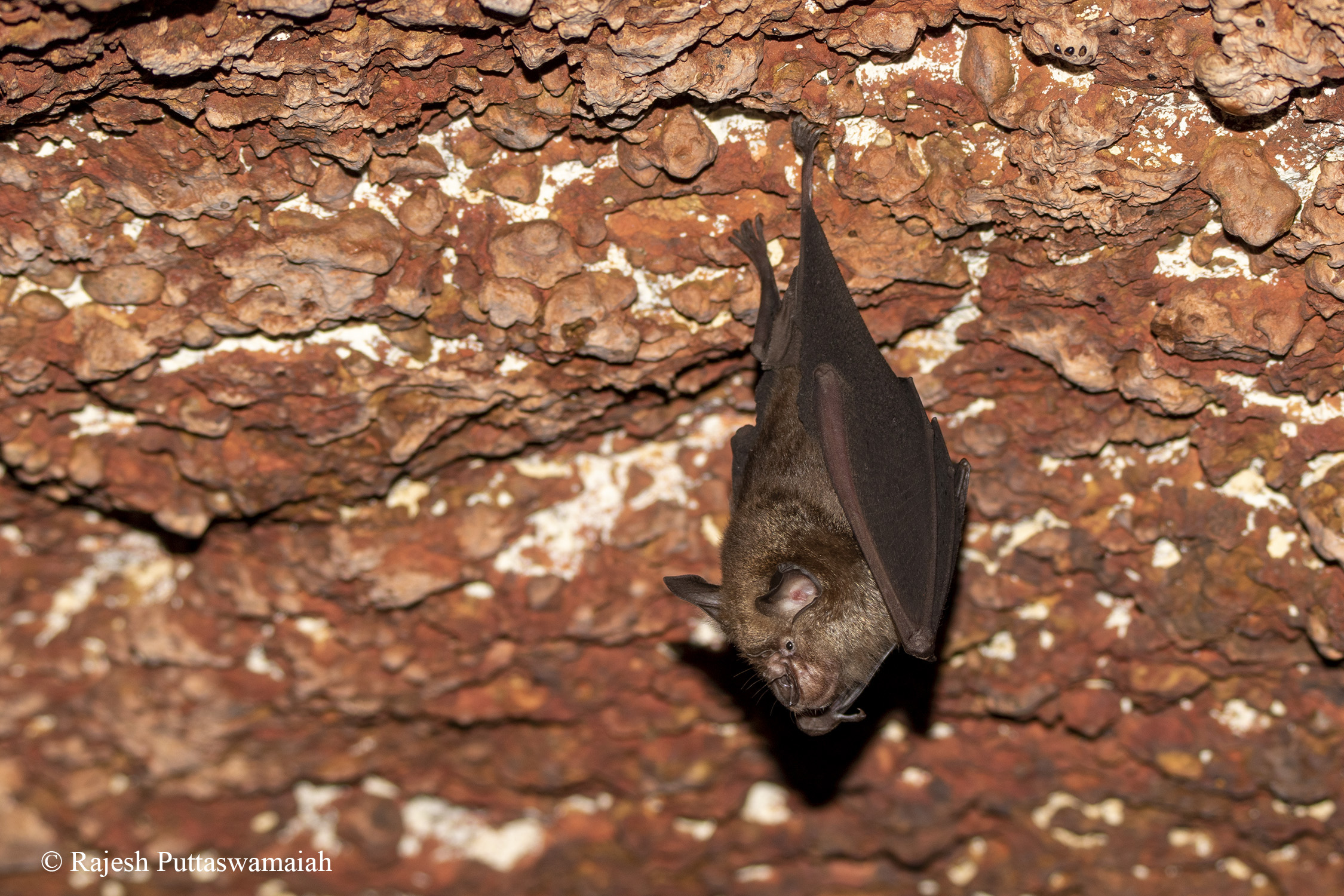

Conservation status
- Data Deficient (IUCN 3.1)

Scientific classification
- Kingdom: Animalia
- Phylum: Chordata
- Class: Mammalia
- Order: Chiroptera
- Family: Rhinolophidae
- Genus: Rhinolophus
- Species: R. indorouxii

Binomial name
- Rhinolophus indorouxii Chattopadhyay, Garg, Kumar, Doss, Ramakrishnan, & Kandula, 2012

= Rhinolophus indorouxii =

Species of bat

Rhinolophus indorouxii is a species of horse-shoe bat in the family Rhinolophidae that is found in Southern India.

== Taxonomy ==
The species was initially thought to be a sub-population of R. rouxii rouxii, before being distinguished as a separate subspecies on the basis of acoustic and morphological differences between R. indorouxii and R. rouxii. R. indorouxii has a frequency of about 92.9-95.4 kHz, while R. indorouxii has a frequency of about 77.9-84.7 kHz. R. indorouxii also has a significantly larger forearm than R. rouxii. There is a genetic distance of about 8% between the two species.

== Distribution and habitat ==
The species prefers high altitude and moist forested habitats. It is observed mostly in elevated areas with rainfall. Roost types include caves and crevices, and may also include man-made structures. The species has been observed up till altitudes of 1,500 meters. It is known to exist in parts of Eastern Ghats of Tamil Nadu and in the Southern Western Ghats south of the Palghat gap, and may also exist in Kerala.

== Threats ==
There is thought to be a threat to the species from human caused disturbances and forest fragmentation, however not enough is known about the species to assess how much of a risk this is.
