= Kashmir flying squirrel =

Conservation status
- Least Concern (IUCN 3.1)

Scientific classification
- Kingdom: Animalia
- Phylum: Chordata
- Class: Mammalia
- Order: Rodentia
- Family: Sciuridae
- Tribe: Pteromyini
- Genus: Eoglaucomys; A. H. Howell, 1915
- Species: E. fimbriatus

Binomial name
- Eoglaucomys fimbriatus (J. E. Gray, 1837)

Subspecies
- Eoglaucomys fimbriatus fimbriatus Eoglaucomys fimbriatus baberi

Synonyms
- Sciuropterus fimbriatus J. E. Gray, 1837; Hylopetes fimbriatus (J. E. Gray, 1837)

Species of rodent

The Kashmir flying squirrel (Eoglaucomys fimbriatus) is a species of rodent in the family Sciuridae. It is monotypic within the genus Eoglaucomys. It is found in Afghanistan, India and Pakistan. Its natural habitat is subtropical or tropical dry forests. It is threatened by habitat loss. The Afghan flying squirrel is usually considered a subspecies.

== Diet ==
The Kashmir flying squirrel's diet consists mainly of flowers or flower buds, seeds, fruits and a small amount of foliage, compared to other flying squirrel species like P. petaurista, also called the red giant flying squirrel.
