= Afghan flying squirrel =

Scientific classification
- Domain: Eukaryota
- Kingdom: Animalia
- Phylum: Chordata
- Class: Mammalia
- Order: Rodentia
- Family: Sciuridae
- Genus: Eoglaucomys
- Species: E. fimbriatus
- Subspecies: E. f. baberi

Trinomial name
- Eoglaucomys fimbriatus baberi (Blyth, 1847)

Synonyms
- Hylobates baberi

Subspecies of rodent

The Afghan flying squirrel (Eoglaucomys fimbriatus baberi) is a subspecies of rodent in the family Sciuridae. It is endemic to Afghanistan.

== Biology ==
The Afghan flying squirrel is not considered to be threatened to become an endangered species because it is widely distributed, it has a large population, and the population is not declining fast enough. The only threats that affect the Afghan flying squirrel are selective logging, modernization, hunting for the fur trade. It has a generation time of approximately 4 to 5 years, and it has up to two litters annually. It usually has 2 to 4 young.

== Location ==
The Afghan flying squirrel is known to be found in montane coniferous forests. The Afghan flying squirrel is native to the following countries:

- Afghanistan
- India
- Pakistan

== Notes ==
- Baillie, J. 1996. Hylopetes baberi. 2006 IUCN Red List of Threatened Species. Downloaded on 29 July 2007.
- Thorington, R. W. Jr. and R. S. Hoffman. 2005. Family Sciuridae. pp. 754–818 in Mammal Species of the World a Taxonomic and Geographic Reference. D. E. Wilson and D. M. Reeder eds. Johns Hopkins University Press, Baltimore.
