= List of rhinolophids =

Species in mammal family Rhinolophidae

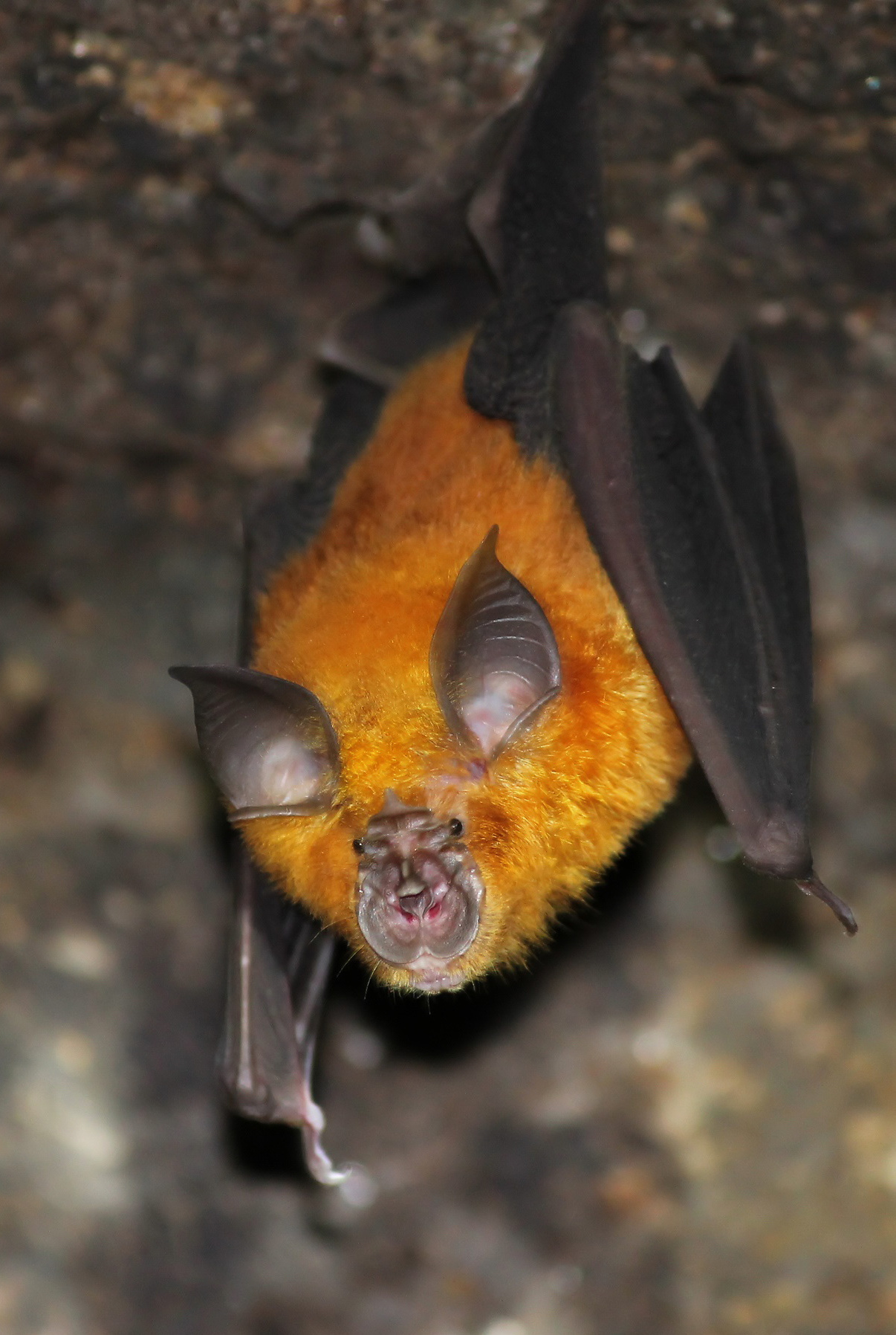
Rufous horseshoe bat (Rhinolophus rouxii)

Rhinolophidae is one of the twenty families of bats in the mammalian order Chiroptera and part of the Yinpterochiroptera suborder. A member of this family is called a rhinolophid or a horseshoe bat. They are named for the shape of their nose-leaf. They are found in Europe, Africa, Asia, and Australia, primarily in forests, savannas, grasslands, and caves, though some species can also be found in deserts or wetlands. They range in size from the Thai horseshoe bat, at 3 cm (1 in) plus a 1 cm (0.4 in) tail, to the Maclaud's horseshoe bat, at 10 cm (4 in) plus a 5 cm (2 in) tail. Like all bats, rhinolophids are capable of true and sustained flight, and have forearm lengths ranging from 3 cm (1 in) in the Formosan lesser horseshoe bat and little Nepalese horseshoe bat, to 8 cm (3 in) in the great woolly horseshoe bat. They are all insectivorous and eat a variety of insects and spiders. Most rhinolophids do not have population estimates, but the ones that do range from 900 adult individuals to 20,000. Thirteen species—the Andaman horseshoe bat, Bornean woolly horseshoe bat, Guinean horseshoe bat, Hill's horseshoe bat, King horseshoe bat, Maclaud's horseshoe bat, Mount Mabu horseshoe bat, Poso horseshoe bat, Ruwenzori horseshoe bat, Timorese horseshoe bat, Willard's horseshoe bat, Yaeyama little horseshoe bat, and Ziama horseshoe bat—are categorized as endangered species. These collectively make up almost fifteen percent of the species in the family.

The 118 extant species of Rhinolophidae are all included in a single genus, Rhinolophus. A few extinct prehistoric rhinolophid species have been discovered, though due to ongoing research and discoveries the exact number and categorization is not fixed.

== Conventions ==
IUCN Red List categories
Conservation status
- EX: Extinct (0 species)
- EW: Extinct in the wild (0 species)
- CR: Critically endangered (0 species)
- EN: Endangered (13 species)
- VU: Vulnerable (5 species)
- NT: Near threatened (9 species)
- LC: Least concern (49 species)

Other categories
- DD: Data deficient (13 species)
- NE: Not evaluated (29 species)

The author citation for the species or genus is given after the scientific name; parentheses around the author citation indicate that this was not the original taxonomic placement. Conservation status codes listed follow the International Union for Conservation of Nature (IUCN) Red List of Threatened Species. Range maps are provided wherever possible; if a range map is not available, a description of the rhinolophid's range is provided. Ranges are based on the IUCN Red List for that species unless otherwise noted.

== Classification ==
The family Rhinolophidae consists of a single genus, Rhinolophus, containing 118 extant species.

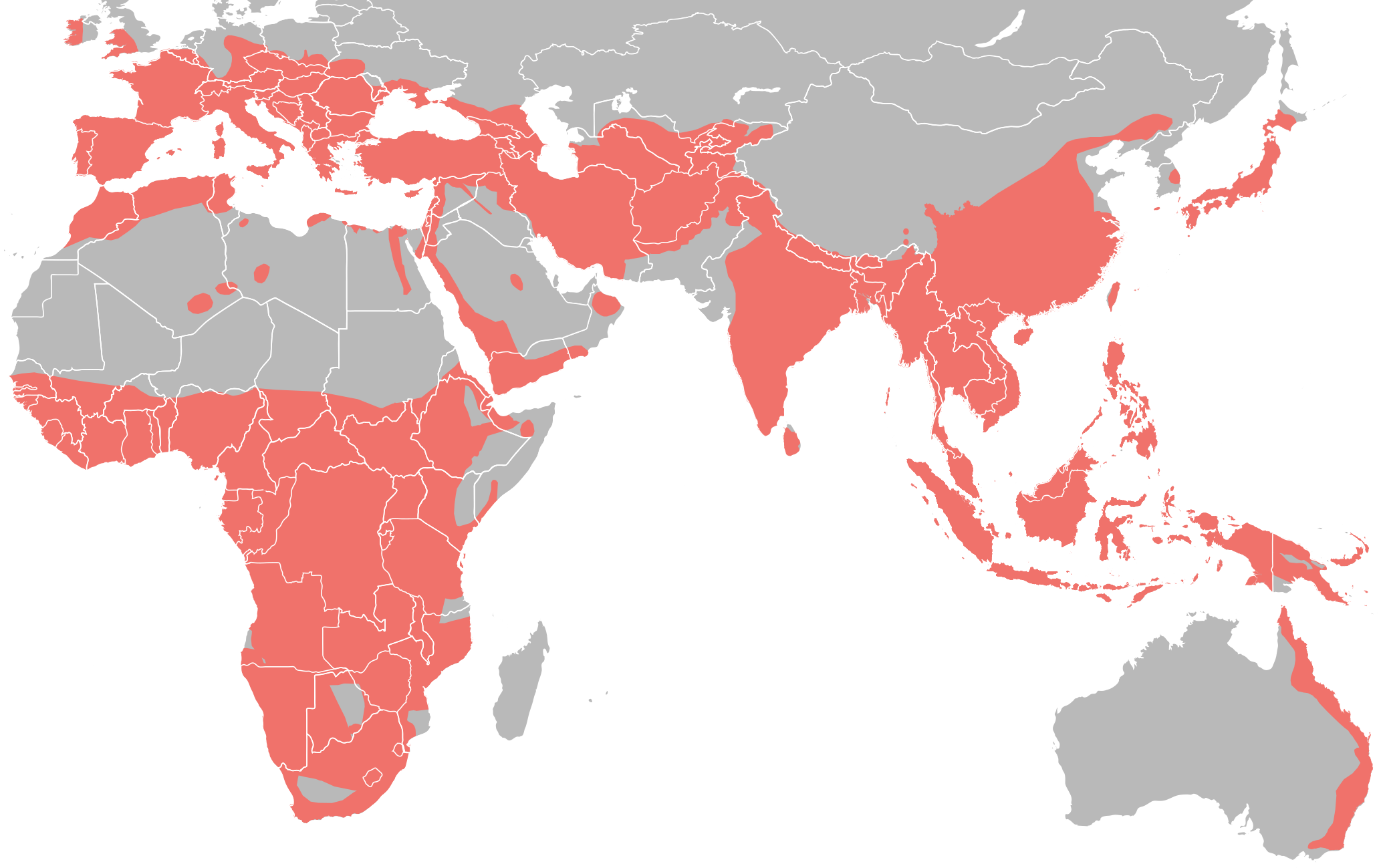
Rhinolophidae distribution

== Rhinolophids ==
The following classification is based on the taxonomy described by the reference work Mammal Species of the World (2005), with augmentation by generally accepted proposals made since using molecular phylogenetic analysis, as supported by both the IUCN SSC Bat Specialist Group and the American Society of Mammalogists.

Genus Rhinolophus – Lacépède, 1799 – 118 species
| Common name | Scientific name and subspecies | Range | Size and ecology | IUCN status and estimated population |
|---|---|---|---|---|
| Acuminate horseshoe bat | R. acuminatus Peters, 1871 | Southeastern Asia | Size: 4–6 cm (2 in), plus 1–4 cm (0.4–1.6 in) tail 4–6 cm (2 in) forearm length Habitat: Forest and caves | LC Unknown |
| Adam's horseshoe bat | R. adami Aellen & Brosset, 1968 | Republic of the Congo | Size: Unknown length, plus 2–3 cm (1 in) tail 4–6 cm (2 in) forearm length Habitat: Forest and caves | DD Unknown |
| Andaman horseshoe bat | R. cognatus K. Andersen, 1906 | Andaman Islands | Size: About 4 cm (2 in), plus 1–3 cm (0.4–1.2 in) tail 3–5 cm (1–2 in) forearm length Habitat: Forest and caves | EN Unknown |
| Andersen's woolly horseshoe bat | R. foetidus K. Andersen, 1918 | Borneo | Size: About 9 cm (4 in), plus 3–6 cm (1–2 in) tail 6–8 cm (2–3 in) forearm length Habitat: Caves, rocky areas, and forest | NE Unknown |
| Arcuate horseshoe bat | R. arcuatus Peters, 1871 Two subspecies: R. a. arcuatus; R. a. exiguus | Southeastern Asia | Size: 4–7 cm (2–3 in), plus 1–3 cm (0.4–1.2 in) tail 4–6 cm (2 in) forearm length Habitat: Forest and caves | DD Unknown |
| Beddome's horseshoe bat | R. beddomei K. Andersen, 1905 | Southern India and Sri Lanka | Size: 6–8 cm (2–3 in), plus 3–5 cm (1–2 in) tail 5–7 cm (2–3 in) forearm length Habitat: Forest and caves | LC Unknown |
| Big-eared horseshoe bat | R. macrotis Blyth, 1844 Four subspecies: R. m. caldwelli; R. m. huananus; R. m. macrotis; R. m. topali | Eastern and southeastern Asia | Size: 4–6 cm (2 in), plus 1–4 cm (0.4–1.6 in) tail 4–6 cm (2 in) forearm length Habitat: Forest and caves | LC Unknown |
| Blasius's horseshoe bat | R. blasii Peters, 1866 | Scattered Africa, southern Europe, and western Asia | Size: 4–6 cm (2 in), plus 2–4 cm (1–2 in) tail 4–6 cm (2 in) forearm length Habitat: Forest, savanna, shrubland, caves, and desert | LC Unknown |
| Blyth's horseshoe bat | R. lepidus Blyth, 1844 | Southern and southeastern Asia | Size: 3–6 cm (1–2 in), plus 1–3 cm (0.4–1.2 in) tail 3–5 cm (1–2 in) forearm length Habitat: Forest and caves | LC Unknown |
| Bokhara horseshoe bat | R. bocharicus Kastschenko & Akimov, 1917 | Central Asia | Size: 3–5 cm (1–2 in), plus 2–4 cm (1–2 in) tail 4–6 cm (2 in) forearm length Habitat: Shrubland, grassland, rocky areas, caves, and desert | LC Unknown |
| Bornean horseshoe bat | R. borneensis Peters, 1861 | Southeastern Asia | Size: Unknown length, plus 2–3 cm (1 in) tail 4–6 cm (2 in) forearm length Habitat: Forest, rocky areas, and caves | LC Unknown |
| Bornean woolly horseshoe bat | R. proconsulis Hill, 1959 | Borneo | Size: Unknown length 4–6 cm (2 in) forearm length Habitat: Forest | EN Unknown |
| Broad-eared horseshoe bat | R. euryotis Temminck, 1835 | Southeastern Asia | Size: 5–8 cm (2–3 in), plus 1–3 cm (0.4–1.2 in) tail 4–6 cm (2 in) forearm length Habitat: Caves and forest | LC Unknown |
| Bushveld horseshoe bat | R. simulator K. Andersen, 1904 | Eastern and western Africa | Size: 3–7 cm (1–3 in), plus 1–3 cm (0.4–1.2 in) tail 3–5 cm (1–2 in) forearm length Habitat: Savanna and caves | LC Unknown |
| Cameroon horseshoe bat | R. alticolus Sanborn, 1936 | Cameroon | Size: 5–6 cm (2 in), plus 2–3 cm (1–1 in) tail about 5 cm (2 in) forearm length Habitat: Savanna and caves | NE Unknown |
| Canut's horseshoe bat | R. canuti Thomas & Wroughton, 1909 | Indonesia | Size: 5–7 cm (2–3 in), plus 1–3 cm (0.4–1.2 in) tail 4–6 cm (2 in) forearm length Habitat: Forest and caves | VU 7,500–10,000 |
| Cape horseshoe bat | R. capensis Lichtenstein, 1823 | Southern Africa | Size: 5–7 cm (2–3 in), plus 2–4 cm (1–2 in) tail 4–6 cm (2 in) forearm length Habitat: Shrubland and caves | LC Unknown |
| Červený's horseshoe bat | R. cervenyi Benda, Uvizl, Eiseb, & Avenant, 2024 | Southern Africa | Size: Unknown Habitat: Caves | NE Unknown |
| Chasen's horseshoe bat | R. chaseni Sanborn, 1939 | Southeast Asia | Size: 4–6 cm (2 in), plus 2–4 cm (1–2 in) tail 4–5 cm (2 in) forearm length Habitat: Rocky areas and forest | NE Unknown |
| Chiewkwee's horseshoe bat | R. chiewkweeae Yoshiyuki & Liat, 2005 | Southeastern Asia | Size: 5–7 cm (2–3 in), plus 1–2 cm (0.4–0.8 in) tail 4–6 cm (2 in) forearm length Habitat: Forest | DD Unknown |
| Chinese rufous horseshoe bat | R. sinicus K. Andersen, 1905 | Eastern Asia | Size: 4–6 cm (2 in), plus 2–3 cm (1 in) tail 4–6 cm (2 in) forearm length Habitat: Forest and caves | LC Unknown |
| Cohen's horseshoe bat | R. cohenae Taylor, Stoffberg, Monadjem, Schoeman, Bayliss, & Cotterill, 2012 | South Africa | Size: 7–9 cm (3–4 in), plus 3–5 cm (1–2 in) tail 6–7 cm (2–3 in) forearm length Habitat: Savanna, grassland, rocky areas, and caves | VU 900–1,000 |
| Convex horseshoe bat | R. convexus Csorba, 1997 | Southeastern Asia | Size: Unknown length, plus 1–3 cm (0.4–1.2 in) tail 4–6 cm (2 in) forearm length Habitat: Forest | DD Unknown |
| Creagh's horseshoe bat | R. creaghi Thomas, 1896 | Southeastern Asia | Size: About 5 cm (2 in), plus 1–2 cm (0.4–0.8 in) tail 4–6 cm (2 in) forearm length Habitat: Forest and caves | LC Unknown |
| Croslet horseshoe bat | R. coelophyllus Peters, 1867 | Southeastern Asia | Size: 3–5 cm (1–2 in), plus 1–3 cm (0.4–1.2 in) tail 4–6 cm (2 in) forearm length Habitat: Forest and caves | LC Unknown |
| Damara horseshoe bat | R. damarensis Roberts, 1946 | Southern Africa | Size: 6–7 cm (2–3 in), plus 2–4 cm (1–2 in) tail 4–6 cm (2 in) forearm length Habitat: Savanna, shrubland, and desert | LC 20,000 |
| Darling's horseshoe bat | R. darlingi K. Andersen, 1905 | Southern Africa | Size: 5–7 cm (2–3 in), plus 2–4 cm (1–2 in) tail 4–6 cm (2 in) forearm length Habitat: Savanna and caves | LC Unknown |
| Decken's horseshoe bat | R. deckenii Peters, 1867 | Eastern Africa | Size: 5–7 cm (2–3 in), plus 2–4 cm (1–2 in) tail 4–6 cm (2 in) forearm length Habitat: Forest and caves | NT Unknown |
| Dent's horseshoe bat | R. denti Thomas, 1904 | Southern and western Africa | Size: 4–6 cm (2 in), plus 1–3 cm (0.4–1.2 in) tail 3–5 cm (1–2 in) forearm length Habitat: Savanna and caves | LC Unknown |
| Dobson's horseshoe bat | R. yunanensis Dobson, 1872 | Southeastern Asia | Size: 5–8 cm (2–3 in), plus 1–3 cm (0.4–1.2 in) tail 4–6 cm (2 in) forearm length Habitat: Forest and caves | LC Unknown |
| Eloquent horseshoe bat | R. eloquens K. Andersen, 1905 | Eastern Africa | Size: 6–8 cm (2–3 in), plus 2–5 cm (1–2 in) tail 5–7 cm (2–3 in) forearm length Habitat: Forest, savanna, and caves | LC Unknown |
| Eritrean horseshoe bat | R. acrotis von Heuglin, 1861 | Central and southern Africa | Size: Unknown Habitat: Forest, savanna, shrubland, caves, and desert | NE Unknown |
| Forest horseshoe bat | R. silvestris Aellen, 1959 | West-central Africa | Size: Unknown length, plus 2–4 cm (1–2 in) tail 4–6 cm (2 in) forearm length Habitat: Forest and caves | DD Unknown |
| Formosan lesser horseshoe bat | R. monoceros Temminck, 1835 | Japan and China | Size: 4–6 cm (2 in), plus 1–3 cm (0.4–1.2 in) tail 3–4 cm (1–2 in) forearm length Habitat: Unrecorded | NE Unknown |
| Formosan woolly horseshoe bat | R. formosae Sanborn, 1939 | Taiwan | Size: 6–9 cm (2–4 in), plus 2–5 cm (1–2 in) tail 5–7 cm (2–3 in) forearm length Habitat: Forest and caves | LC Unknown |
| Francis's woolly horseshoe bat | R. francisi Soisook, Struebig, Bates, & Portela Miguez, 2015 | Indonesia, Malaysia, and Thailand | Size: About 6 cm (2 in), plus 2–4 cm (0.8–1.6 in) tail 5–6 cm (2 in) forearm length Habitat: Unknown | NE Unknown |
| Geoffroy's horseshoe bat | R. clivosus Cretzschmar, 1828 Two subspecies: R. c. brachygnathus; R. c. clivosus | Africa and Arabian Peninsula | Size: 4–6 cm (2 in), plus 2–4 cm (1–2 in) tail 4–6 cm (2 in) forearm length Habitat: Forest, savanna, shrubland, caves, and desert | LC Unknown |
| Glossy horseshoe bat | R. refulgens K. Andersen, 1905 | Southeastern Asia | Size: 3–6 cm (1–2 in), plus 1–3 cm (0–1 in) tail 3–5 cm (1–2 in) forearm length Habitat: Forest and caves | NE Unknown |
| Great woolly horseshoe bat | R. luctus Temminck, 1834 | Southern and southeastern Asia | Size: 7–9 cm (3–4 in), plus 3–6 cm (1–2 in) tail 5–8 cm (2–3 in) forearm length Habitat: Caves, rocky areas, and forest | LC Unknown |
| Greater horseshoe bat | R. ferrumequinum (Schreber, 1774) Six subspecies: R. f. creticum; R. f. ferrumequinum; R. f. irani; R. f. korai; R. f. proximus; R. f. tragatus | Europe, Asia, and northern Africa | Size: 5–8 cm (2–3 in), plus 3–5 cm (1–2 in) tail 5–7 cm (2–3 in) forearm length Habitat: Forest, shrubland, grassland, and caves | LC Unknown |
| Greater Japanese horseshoe bat | R. nippon Temminck, 1835 | Southern and eastern Asia | Size: 5–8 cm (2–3 in), plus 2–5 cm (1–2 in) tail 4–7 cm (2–3 in) forearm length Habitat: Forest, shrubland, grassland, and caves | NE Unknown |
| Guardian horseshoe bat | R. episcopus Allen, 1923 | China and Vietnam | Size: 5–6 cm (2 in), plus 2–4 cm (1–2 in) tail 4–5 cm (2 in) forearm length Habitat: Forest and caves | NE Unknown |
| Guinean horseshoe bat | R. guineensis Eisentraut, 1960 | Western Africa | Size: 4–6 cm (2 in), plus 2–3 cm (1 in) tail 4–6 cm (2 in) forearm length Habitat: Forest, savanna, grassland, inland wetlands, and caves | EN Unknown |
| Halcyon horseshoe bat | R. alcyone Temminck, 1852 | Western and central Africa | Size: 5–7 cm (2–3 in), plus 1–4 cm (0.4–1.6 in) tail 4–6 cm (2 in) forearm length Habitat: Forest, savanna, and caves | LC Unknown |
| Hairy horseshoe bat | R. hirsutus K. Andersen, 1905 | Philippines | Size: 5–6 cm (2 in), plus 2–4 cm (1–2 in) tail 4–5 cm (2 in) forearm length Habitat: Forest and caves | NE Unknown |
| Hildebrandt's horseshoe bat | R. hildebrandtii Peters, 1878 | Eastern Africa | Size: 7–9 cm (3–4 in), plus 3–5 cm (1–2 in) tail 6–7 cm (2–3 in) forearm length Habitat: Forest, savanna, and caves | LC Unknown |
| Hill's horseshoe bat | R. hilli Aellen, 1973 | Rwanda | Size: About 6 cm (2 in), plus about 3 cm (1 in) tail about 5 cm (2 in) forearm length Habitat: Forest and caves | EN Unknown |
| Hills' horseshoe bat | R. hillorum Koopman, 1989 | Scattered Equatorial Africa | Size: 6–8 cm (2–3 in), plus 3–5 cm (1–2 in) tail 4–6 cm (2 in) forearm length Habitat: Forest, grassland, and caves | VU Unknown |
| Homfray's horseshoe bat | R. andamanensis Dobson, 1872 | Andaman and Nicobar Islands | Size: About 6 cm (2 in), plus 1–4 cm (0.4–1.6 in) tail 4–6 cm (2 in) forearm length Habitat: Forest and caves | NE Unknown |
| Horáček's horseshoe bat | R. horaceki Benda & Vallo, 2012 | Libya | Size: About 6 cm (2 in), plus 3 cm (1 in) tail 4–5 cm (2 in) forearm length Habitat: Forest, savanna, shrubland, caves, and desert | NE Unknown |
| Imaizumi's horseshoe bat | R. imaizumii Hill & Yoshiyuki, 1980 | Japan | Size: 3–5 cm (1–2 in), plus 1–3 cm (0.4–1.2 in) tail 4–6 cm (2 in) forearm length Habitat: Unrecorded | NE Unknown |
| Indo-Chinese lesser brown horseshoe bat | R. microglobosus Csorba & Jenkins, 1998 | Southeastern Asia | Size: 3–6 cm (1–2 in), plus 1–3 cm (0.4–1.2 in) tail 4–6 cm (2 in) forearm length Habitat: Caves and forest | LC Unknown |
| Insular horseshoe bat | R. keyensis Peters, 1871 | Indonesia | Size: 3–5 cm (1–2 in), plus 1–3 cm (0.4–1.2 in) tail 3–5 cm (1–2 in) forearm length Habitat: Unknown | DD Unknown |
| Intermediate horseshoe bat | R. affinis Horsfield, 1823 Eight subspecies: R. a. affinis; R. a. hainanus; R. a. himalayanus; R. a. macrurus; R. a. nesites; R. a. princes; R. a. superans; R. a. tener | Southeastern Asia | Size: 4–7 cm (2–3 in), plus 1–4 cm (0.4–1.6 in) tail 4–6 cm (2 in) forearm length Habitat: Forest and caves | LC Unknown |
| King horseshoe bat | R. rex Allen, 1923 | Eastern China | Size: 4–6 cm (2 in), plus 1–4 cm (0.4–1.6 in) tail 5–7 cm (2–3 in) forearm length Habitat: Forest and caves | EN 1,500–2,000 |
| Kyrgyzstan horseshoe bat | R. kirghisorum Horáček, Uvizl, & Benda, 2024 | Afghanistan, Kyrgyzstan, and Tajikistan | Size: Unknown Habitat: Forest and caves | NE Unknown |
| Lander's horseshoe bat | R. landeri Martin, 1837 | Sub-Saharan Africa | Size: 4–6 cm (2 in), plus about 3 cm (1 in) tail 3–5 cm (1–2 in) forearm length Habitat: Forest, savanna, shrubland, and caves | LC Unknown |
| Large rufous horseshoe bat | R. rufus Eydoux & Gervais, 1836 | Philippines | Size: 8–10 cm (3–4 in), plus 3–4 cm (1–2 in) tail 6–8 cm (2–3 in) forearm length Habitat: Forest and caves | NT Unknown |
| Large-eared horseshoe bat | R. philippinensis Waterhouse, 1843 | Southeastern Asia and northeastern Australia | Size: 5–7 cm (2–3 in), plus 2–4 cm (1–2 in) tail 4–6 cm (2 in) forearm length Habitat: Caves and forest | LC Unknown |
| Least horseshoe bat | R. pusillus Temminck, 1834 | Eastern and southeastern Asia | Size: 3–5 cm (1–2 in), plus 1–3 cm (0.4–1.2 in) tail 3–5 cm (1–2 in) forearm length Habitat: Forest and caves | LC Unknown |
| Lesser brown horseshoe bat | R. stheno K. Andersen, 1905 | Southeastern Asia | Size: 4–6 cm (2 in), plus 1–3 cm (0.4–1.2 in) tail 4–6 cm (2 in) forearm length Habitat: Forest | LC Unknown |
| Lesser horseshoe bat | R. hipposideros (Bechstein, 1800) | Europe, western Asia, and northern Africa | Size: 3–5 cm (1–2 in), plus 2–4 cm (1–2 in) tail 3–5 cm (1–2 in) forearm length Habitat: Forest, shrubland, grassland, and caves | LC Unknown |
| Lesser woolly horseshoe bat | R. sedulus K. Andersen, 1905 | Southeastern Asia | Size: 4–6 cm (2 in), plus 1–3 cm (0.4–1.2 in) tail 3–5 cm (1–2 in) forearm length Habitat: Forest and caves | NT Unknown |
| Little Japanese horseshoe bat | R. cornutus Temminck, 1834 Two subspecies: R. c. cornutus; R. c. orii | Japan and China | Size: 3–6 cm (1–2 in), plus 1–3 cm (0.4–1.2 in) tail 3–5 cm (1–2 in) forearm length Habitat: Forest | NT Unknown |
| Little Nepalese horseshoe bat | R. subbadius Blyth, 1844 | Eastern Asia | Size: 3–4 cm (1–2 in), plus 1–2 cm (0.4–0.8 in) tail 3–4 cm (1–2 in) forearm length Habitat: Forest and caves | LC Unknown |
| Little Okinawan horseshoe bat | R. pumilus K. Andersen, 1905 | Japan | Size: 3–5 cm (1–2 in), plus tail 3–4 cm (1–2 in) forearm length Habitat: Forest | NE Unknown |
| Lobed horseshoe bat | R. lobatus Peters, 1851 | Central and southern Africa | Size: 5–6 cm (2 in), plus 2–4 cm (1–2 in) tail 4–5 cm (2 in) forearm length Habitat: Forest, savanna, shrubland, and caves | NE Unknown |
| Maclaud's horseshoe bat | R. maclaudi Pousargues, 1897 | Western Africa | Size: 7–10 cm (3–4 in), plus 3–5 cm (1–2 in) tail 6–7 cm (2–3 in) forearm length Habitat: Savanna and caves | EN Unknown |
| Madura horseshoe bat | R. madurensis K. Andersen, 1918 | Indonesia | Size: Unknown length 3–5 cm (1–2 in) forearm length Habitat: Forest and caves | VU Unknown |
| Maendeleo horseshoe bat | R. maendeleo Kock, Csorba, & Howell, 2000 | Eastern Africa | Size: 4–6 cm (2 in), plus 2–3 cm (1 in) tail 4–6 cm (2 in) forearm length Habitat: Forest and caves | DD Unknown |
| Malayan horseshoe bat | R. malayanus Bonhote, 1903 | Southeastern Asia | Size: 3–5 cm (1–2 in), plus 1–3 cm (0.4–1.2 in) tail 3–5 cm (1–2 in) forearm length Habitat: Forest and caves | LC Unknown |
| Malaysian woolly horseshoe bat | R. morio Gray, 1842 | Malaysia and Thailand | Size: 7–9 cm (3–4 in), plus 4–6 cm (2 in) tail 6–7 cm (2–3 in) forearm length Habitat: Caves, rocky areas, and forest | NE Unknown |
| Marshall's horseshoe bat | R. marshalli Thonglongya, 1973 | Southeastern Asia | Size: 4–6 cm (2 in), plus 1–3 cm (0.4–1.2 in) tail 3–5 cm (1–2 in) forearm length Habitat: Forest, rocky areas, and caves | LC Unknown |
| McIntyre's horseshoe bat | R. mcintyrei Hill & Schlitter, 1982 | Papua New Guinea | Size: 4–7 cm (2–3 in), plus 1–3 cm (0.4–1.2 in) tail 4–6 cm (2 in) forearm length Habitat: Forest | DD Unknown |
| Mediterranean horseshoe bat | R. euryale Blasius, 1853 | Europe, western Asia, and northern Africa | Size: 4–6 cm (2 in), plus 2–3 cm (1 in) tail 4–6 cm (2 in) forearm length Habitat: Forest, shrubland, and caves | NT Unknown |
| Mehely's horseshoe bat | R. mehelyi Matschie, 1901 | Southern Europe, western Asia, and northern Africa | Size: 4–7 cm (2–3 in), plus 2–4 cm (1–2 in) tail 2–4 cm (1–2 in) forearm length Habitat: Shrubland and caves | VU Unknown |
| Midas' horseshoe bat | R. midas K. Andersen, 1905 | Iran and Oman | Size: Unknown Habitat: Forest, shrubland, grassland, and caves | NE Unknown |
| Mitred horseshoe bat | R. mitratus Blyth, 1844 | Eastern India | Size: About 7 cm (3 in), plus about 3 cm (1 in) tail about 6 cm (2 in) forearm length Habitat: Unknown | DD Unknown |
| Mountain horseshoe bat | R. chutamasae Soisook & Bates, 2022 | Thailand and Laos | Size: 4–5 cm (2 in), plus 1–3 cm (0–1 in) tail 4–5 cm (2 in) forearm length Habitat: Forest and caves | NE Unknown |
| Mount Mabu horseshoe bat | R. mabuensis Taylor, Stoffberg, Monadjem, Schoeman, Bayliss, & Cotterill, 2012 | Mozambique | Size: 7–9 cm (3–4 in), plus 3–5 cm (1–2 in) tail 6–7 cm (2–3 in) forearm length Habitat: Caves and forest | EN Unknown |
| Mozambican horseshoe bat | R. mossambicus Taylor, Stoffberg, Monadjem, Schoeman, Bayliss, & Cotterill, 2012 | Southeastern Africa | Size: Unknown length 6–7 cm (2–3 in) forearm length Habitat: Forest, savanna, and caves | LC Unknown |
| Namuli horseshoe bat | R. namuli Curran, Kopp, Ruedi, & Bayliss, 2022 | Mozambique | Size: Unknown Habitat: Shrubland and caves | NE Unknown |
| Neriad horseshoe bat | R. nereis K. Andersen, 1905 | Siantan Island in Indonesia | Size: Unknown length, plus about 2 cm (1 in) tail about 4 cm (2 in) forearm length Habitat: Unknown | DD Unknown |
| Northern horseshoe bat | R. septentrionalis Sanborn, 1939 | China | Size: Unknown Habitat: Forest and caves | NE Unknown |
| Northern woolly horseshoe bat | R. perniger Hodgson, 1843 | Eastern and southeastern Asia | Size: 7–10 cm (3–4 in), plus 3–7 cm (1–3 in) tail 6–9 cm (2–4 in) forearm length Habitat: Caves, rocky areas, and forest | NE Unknown |
| Osgood's horseshoe bat | R. osgoodi Sanborn, 1939 | Southern China | Size: Unknown length, plus 1–3 cm (0.4–1.2 in) tail 4–6 cm (2 in) forearm length Habitat: Caves | LC Unknown |
| Pearson's horseshoe bat | R. pearsonii Horsfield, 1851 | Eastern and southeastern Asia | Size: 5–7 cm (2–3 in), plus 1–3 cm (0.4–1.2 in) tail 4–6 cm (2 in) forearm length Habitat: Forest and caves | LC Unknown |
| Peninsular horseshoe bat | R. robinsoni K. Andersen, 1918 | Malaysia and Thailand | Size: 4–6 cm (2 in), plus 1–3 cm (0.4–1.2 in) tail 4–6 cm (2 in) forearm length Habitat: Rocky areas and forest | NT Unknown |
| Philippine forest horseshoe bat | R. inops K. Andersen, 1905 | Philippines | Size: 5–7 cm (2–3 in), plus 1–3 cm (0.4–1.2 in) tail 4–6 cm (2 in) forearm length Habitat: Forest | LC Unknown |
| Poso horseshoe bat | R. belligerator Patrick, McCulloch, & Ruedas, 2013 | Sulawesi Island in Indonesia | Size: 5–7 cm (2–3 in), plus 1–3 cm (0.4–1.2 in) tail 4–6 cm (2 in) forearm length Habitat: Unknown | EN Unknown |
| Queensland horseshoe bat | R. achilles Thomas, 1900 | Indonesia and northeastern Australia | Size: 5–6 cm (2 in), plus 2–4 cm (1–2 in) tail 5–6 cm (2 in) forearm length Habitat: Caves and forest | NE Unknown |
| Rufous horseshoe bat | R. rouxii Temminck, 1835 | Southern Asia | Size: 4–6 cm (2 in), plus 2–4 cm (1–2 in) tail 4–6 cm (2 in) forearm length Habitat: Forest and caves | LC Unknown |
| Ruwenzori horseshoe bat | R. ruwenzorii Hill, 1942 | Central Africa | Size: 5–8 cm (2–3 in), plus 2–4 cm (1–2 in) tail 5–7 cm (2–3 in) forearm length Habitat: Forest, shrubland, grassland, and caves | EN Unknown |
| Rüppell's horseshoe bat | R. fumigatus Rüppell, 1842 | Sub-Saharan Africa | Size: 4–8 cm (2–3 in), plus 2–4 cm (1–2 in) tail 4–6 cm (2 in) forearm length Habitat: Forest, savanna, and caves | LC Unknown |
| Sakeji horseshoe bat | R. sakejiensis Cotterill, 2002 | Zambia | Size: 4–6 cm (2 in), plus 2–4 cm (1–2 in) tail 4–6 cm (2 in) forearm length Habitat: Savanna | DD Unknown |
| Selangor woolly horseshoe bat | R. luctoides Volleth, Loidl, Mayer, Yong, Müller, & Heller, 2015 | Malaysia | Size: Unknown length 5–7 cm (2–3 in) forearm length Habitat: Caves, rocky areas, and forest | NE Unknown |
| Shamel's horseshoe bat | R. shameli Tate, 1943 | Southeastern Asia | Size: 4–6 cm (2 in), plus 1–3 cm (0.4–1.2 in) tail 4–6 cm (2 in) forearm length Habitat: Forest and caves | LC Unknown |
| Shortridge's horseshoe bat | R. shortridgei K. Andersen, 1918 | Eastern Asia | Size: 4–6 cm (2 in), plus 1–3 cm (0.4–1.2 in) tail 3–5 cm (1–2 in) forearm length Habitat: Forest | DD Unknown |
| Small rufous horseshoe bat | R. subrufus K. Andersen, 1905 | Philippines | Size: 6–7 cm (2–3 in), plus 2–3 cm (1 in) tail 4–6 cm (2 in) forearm length Habitat: Forest and caves | DD Unknown |
| Smaller horseshoe bat | R. megaphyllus Gray, 1834 | Eastern Australia and Papua New Guinea | Size: 4–6 cm (2 in), plus 1–3 cm (0.4–1.2 in) tail 4–6 cm (2 in) forearm length Habitat: Caves and forest | LC Unknown |
| Smithers's horseshoe bat | R. smithersi Taylor, Stoffberg, Monadjem, Schoeman, Bayliss, & Cotterill, 2012 | Southern Africa | Size: 7–9 cm (3–4 in), plus 3–5 cm (1–2 in) tail 6–7 cm (2–3 in) forearm length Habitat: Savanna, shrubland, inland wetlands, and caves | NT Unknown |
| Sudanese horseshoe bat | R. dobsoni Thomas, 1904 | Sudan | Size: Unknown Habitat: Forest, savanna, shrubland, and caves | NE Unknown |
| Sulawesi broad-eared horseshoe bat | R. tatar Bergmans & Rozendaal, 1982 | Sulawesi Island in Indonesia | Size: 5–7 cm (2–3 in), plus 1–3 cm (0.4–1.2 in) tail 4–6 cm (2 in) forearm length Habitat: Forest | LC Unknown |
| Sulawesi horseshoe bat | R. celebensis K. Andersen, 1905 | Indonesia | Size: 4–6 cm (2 in), plus 1–3 cm (0.4–1.2 in) tail 3–5 cm (1–2 in) forearm length Habitat: Forest and caves | LC Unknown |
| Swinny's horseshoe bat | R. swinnyi Gough, 1908 | Southern Africa | Size: 4–6 cm (2 in), plus 1–3 cm (0.4–1.2 in) tail 4–6 cm (2 in) forearm length Habitat: Forest, savanna, and caves | LC Unknown |
| Thai horseshoe bat | R. siamensis Gyldenstolpe, 1917 | Southeastern Asia | Size: 3–4 cm (1–2 in), plus 1–3 cm (0.4–1.2 in) tail 3–5 cm (1–2 in) forearm length Habitat: Forest and caves | LC Unknown |
| Thailand horseshoe bat | R. thailandensis Wu, Harada, & Motokawa, 2009 | Northern Thailand | Size: 6–8 cm (2–3 in), plus 1–3 cm (0.4–1.2 in) tail 5–7 cm (2–3 in) forearm length Habitat: Forest and caves | LC Unknown |
| Thomas's horseshoe bat | R. thomasi K. Andersen, 1905 | Southeastern Asia | Size: 4–6 cm (2 in), plus 1–3 cm (0.4–1.2 in) tail 4–6 cm (2 in) forearm length Habitat: Caves | LC Unknown |
| Timorese horseshoe bat | R. montanus Goodwin, 1979 | East Timor | Size: 4–6 cm (2 in), plus 2–4 cm (1–2 in) tail 4–6 cm (2 in) forearm length Habitat: Caves and unknown | EN Unknown |
| Trefoil horseshoe bat | R. trifoliatus Temminck, 1834 | Southeastern Asia | Size: 5–7 cm (2–3 in), plus 2–4 cm (1–2 in) tail 4–6 cm (2 in) forearm length Habitat: Forest | NT Unknown |
| Tufted horseshoe bat | R. axillaris Allen, 1917 | Democratic Republic of the Congo | Size: Unknown Habitat: Forest, savanna, shrubland, and caves | NE Unknown |
| Webala's horseshoe bat | R. webalai Patterson, Dick, Bartonjo, & Demos, 2024 | South Sudan and Kenya | Size: Unknown Habitat: Forest, savanna, shrubland, and caves | NE Unknown |
| Wedge-sellaed horseshoe bat | R. xinanzhongguoensis Zhou, Guillén-Servent, Lim, Eger, Wang, & Jiang, 2009 | China | Size: 5–7 cm (2–3 in), plus 3–4 cm (1–2 in) tail 4–6 cm (2 in) forearm length Habitat: Forest | NT Unknown |
| Willard's horseshoe bat | R. willardi Peterhans & Fahr, 2013 | Democratic Republic of the Congo | Size: 6–8 cm (2–3 in), plus 2–3 cm (1 in) tail 4–6 cm (2 in) forearm length Habitat: Forest and caves | EN Unknown |
| Yaeyama little horseshoe bat | R. perditus K. Andersen, 1918 | Yaeyama Islands in Japan | Size: 3–5 cm (1–2 in), plus 1–3 cm (0.4–1.2 in) tail 4–6 cm (2 in) forearm length Habitat: Caves, inland wetlands, and forest | EN Unknown |
| Yellow-faced horseshoe bat | R. virgo K. Andersen, 1905 | Philippines | Size: 4–6 cm (2 in), plus 1–3 cm (0.4–1.2 in) tail 3–5 cm (1–2 in) forearm length Habitat: Caves and forest | LC Unknown |
| Yong Hoi Sen's wooly horseshoe bat | R. yonghoiseni Volleth & Heller, 2021 | Malaysia | Size: 4–6 cm (2 in), plus 1–3 cm (0.4–1.2 in) tail 3–5 cm (1–2 in) forearm length Habitat: Forest and caves | NE Unknown |
| Ziama horseshoe bat | R. ziama Fahr, Vierhaus, Hütterer, & Kock, 2002 | Western Africa | Size: 7–8 cm (3 in), plus 3–4 cm (1–2 in) tail about 6 cm (2 in) forearm length Habitat: Caves and forest | EN Unknown |

== Sources ==
- Chernasky, Amy; Motis, Anna; Burgin, Connor, eds. (2023). All the Mammals of the World. Lynx Nature Books. ISBN 978-84-16728-66-4.
- Simmons, Nancy B. (2005). Wilson, Don E.; Reeder, DeeAnn M. (eds.). Mammal Species of the World. Vol. 1 (3rd ed.). Johns Hopkins University Press. ISBN 978-0-8018-8221-0.
- Nowak, Ronald M. (1994). Walker's Bats of the World. Johns Hopkins University Press. ISBN 978-0-8018-4986-2.
