= Hill's horseshoe bat =

Hill's horseshoe bat is the common name for two species of horseshoe bat:

- Rhinolophus hilli
- Hills' horseshoe bat (Rhinolophus hillorum)
