= Hills horseshoe bat =

Hills horseshoe bat may refer to:

- Rhinolophus hilli, commonly known as Hill's horseshoe bat, found only in Rwanda
- Rhinolophus hillorum, commonly known as Hills' horseshoe bata, found in several countries in West and Central Africa
