= List of mammals of Montenegro =

There are at least 87 mammal species in Montenegro. One is critically endangered, 5 are vulnerable, 6 are near threatened and 2 are data deficient.

Icons which state each species' global IUCN status:
| CR | Critically Endangered | In imminent risk of extinction in the wild |
| VU | Vulnerable | Facing a high risk of extinction in the wild |
| NT | Near Threatened | Doesn't meet any of the criteria that would categorise it as risking extinction but likely to in the future |
| LC | Least Concern | No current identifiable risks to this species |
| DD | Data Deficient | Inadequate information to make an assessment of the risks to this species |

== Order: Eulipotyphla (hedgehogs, shrews, moles and solenodons) ==
- Suborder: Erinaceota
  - Family: Erinaceidae
    - Subfamily: Erinaceinae
      - Genus: Erinaceus
        - Northern white-breasted hedgehog, Erinaceus roumanicus LC
  - Family: Talpidae
    - Subfamily: Talpinae
      - Tribe: Talpini
        - Genus: Talpa
          - Balkan mole, Talpa stankovici LC
          - Blind mole, Talpa caeca LC
          - European mole, Talpa europaea LC
  - Family: Soricidae
    - Subfamily: Soricinae
      - Tribe: Nectogalini
        - Genus: Neomys
          - Eurasian water shrew, Neomys anomalus LC
          - Mediterranean water shrew, Neomys fodiens LC
      - Tribe: Soricini
        - Genus: Sorex
          - Alpine shrew, Sorex alpinus NT
          - Common shrew, Sorex araneus LC
          - Dneper common shrew, Sorex averini LC
          - Eurasian pygmy shrew, Sorex minutus LC
    - Subfamily: Crocidurinae
      - Genus: Crocidura
        - Bicolored shrew, Crocidura leucodon LC
        - Lesser white-toothed shrew, Crocidura suaveolens LC
      - Genus: Suncus
        - Etruscan shrew, Suncus etruscus LC
        - Madagascan pygmy shrew, Suncus madagascariensis LC

== Order: Rodentia (rodents) ==
- Suborder: Castorimorpha
  - Superfamily: Castoroidea
    - Family: Castoridae
      - Subfamily: Castorinae
        - Genus: Castor
          - Eurasian beaver, Castor fiber LC
- Suborder: Myomorpha
  - Superfamily: Muroidea
    - Family: Spalacidae
      - Subfamily: Spalacinae
        - Genus: Nannospalax
          - Lesser mole rat, Nannospalax leucodon LC
    - Family: Cricetidae
      - Subfamily: Arvicolinae
        - Tribe: Arvicolini
          - Genus: Arvicola
            - European water vole, Arvicola amphibius LC
          - Genus: Chionomys
            - European snow vole, Chionomys nivalis LC
          - Genus: Microtus
            - Subgenus: Microtus
              - Field vole, Microtus agrestis LC
              - Common vole, Microtus arvalis LC
              - Southern vole, Microtus levis LC
              - European pine vole, Microtus subterraneus LC
            - Subgenus: Terricola
              - Felten's vole, Microtus felteni LC
              - Thomas's pine vole, Microtus thomasi LC
        - Tribe: Myodini
          - Genus: Clethrionomys
            - Bank vole, Clethrionomys glareolus LC
        - Tribe: Pliomyini
          - Genus: Dinaromys
            - Balkan snow vole, Dinaromys bogdanovi VU
    - Family: Muridae
      - Subfamily: Murinae
        - Genus: Apodemus
          - Subgenus: Apodemus
            - Striped field mouse, Apodemus agrarius LC
          - Subgenus: Sylvaemus
            - Yellow-necked mouse, Apodemus flavicollis LC
            - Wood mouse, Apodemus sylvaticus LC
            - Ural field mouse, Apodemus uralensis LC
          - Subgenus: Karstomys
            - Western broad-toothed field mouse, Apodemus epimelas LC
        - Genus: Micromys
          - Eurasian harvest mouse, Micromys minutus LC
        - Genus: Mus
          - House mouse, Mus musculus LC
          - Steppe mouse, Mus spicilegus LC
- Suborder: Sciuromorpha
  - Family: Sciuridae
    - Subfamily: Sciurinae
      - Tribe: Sciurini
        - Genus: Sciurus
          - Subgenus: Sciurus
            - Eurasian red squirrel, Sciurus vulgaris LC
  - Family: Gliridae
    - Subfamily: Leithiinae
      - Genus: Dryomys
        - Forest dormouse, Dryomys nitedula LC
      - Genus: Muscaridinus
        - Hazel dormouse, Muscaridinus avellanarius LC
    - Subfamily: Glirinae
      - Genus: Glis
        - Edible dormouse, Glis glis LC

== Order: Lagomorpha (lagomorphs) ==
- Family: Leporidae
  - Genus: Lepus
    - Subgenus: Eulagos
      - European hare, Lepus europaeus LC

== Order: Chiroptera (bats) ==
- Suborder: Yinpterochiroptera
  - Family: Rhinolophidae
    - Subfamily: Rhinolophinae
      - Genus: Rhinolophus
        - Subgenus: Rhinolophus
          - Species group: Rhinolophus euryale
            - Mediterranean horseshoe bat, Rhinolophus euryale NT
            - Mehely's horseshoe bat, Rhinolophus mehelyi VU
          - Species group: Rhinolophus ferrumquinum
            - Greater horseshoe bat: Rhinolophus ferrumquinum LC
          - Species group: Rhinolophus landeri
            - Blasius's horseshoe bat, Rhinolophus blasii LC
        - Subgenus: Phyllorhina
          - Species group: Rhinolophus hipposideros
            - Lesser horseshoe bat, Rhinolophus hipposideros LC
- Suborder: Yangochiroptera
  - Family: Miniopteridae
    - Genus: Miniopterus
      - Common bent-wing bat, Miniopterus schreibersii VU
  - Family: Molossidae
    - Subfamily: Molossinae
      - Genus: Tadarida
        - European free-tailed bat, Tadarida teniotis LC
  - Family: Vespertilionidae
    - Subfamily: Myotinae
      - Genus: Myotis
        - Subgenus: Chrysopteron
          - Geoffroy's bat, Myotis emarginatus LC
        - Subgenus: Myotis
          - Alcathoe bat, Myotis alcathoe DD
          - Lesser mouse eared bat, Myotis blythii LC
          - Long-fingered bat, Myotis capaccinii VU
          - Pond bat, Myotis dasycneme NT
          - Daubenton's bat, Myotis daubentonii LC
          - Greater mouse-eared bat, Myotis myotis LC
          - Whiskered bat, Myotis mystacinus LC
          - Natterer's bat, Myotis nattereri LC
        - Subgenus: Pizonyx
          - Brandt's bat, Myotis brandtii LC
    - Subfamily: Vespertilioninae
      - Tribe: Eptesicini
        - Genus: Eptesicus
          - Serotine bat, Eptesicus serotinus LC
      - Tribe: Pipistrellini
        - Genus: Nyctalus
          - Lesser noctule, Nyctalus leisleri LC
          - Common noctule, Nyctalus noctula LC
        - Genus: Pipistrellus
          - Kuhl's pipistrelle, Pipistrellus kuhlii LC
          - Nathusius's pipistrelle, Pipistrellus nathusii LC
          - Common pipistrelle, Pipistrellus pipistrellus LC
      - Tribe: Plecotini
        - Genus: Barbastella
          - Western barbastelle, Barbastella barbastellus NT
        - Genus: Plecotus
          - Brown long-eared bat, Plecotus auritus LC
          - Grey long-eared bat, Plecotus austriacus NT
          - Alpine long-eared bat, Plecotus macrobullaris LC
      - Tribe: Vespertilionini
        - Genus: Hypsugo
          - Savi's pipistrelle, Hypsugo savii LC
        - Genus: Vespertilio
          - Parti-coloured bat, Vespertilio murinus

== Order: Cetacea (whales, dolphins and porpoises) ==
- Suborder: Odontoceti
  - Clade: Delphinida
    - Superfamily: Delphinoidea
      - Family: Delphinidae
        - Subfamily: Delphininae
          - Genus: Tursiops
            - Common bottlenose dolphin, Tursiops truncatus LC

== Order: Carnivora (carnivorans) ==
- Suborder: Caniformia
  - Infraorder: Arctoidea
    - Superfamily: Ursoidea
      - Family: Ursidae
        - Subfamily: Ursinae
          - Genus: Ursus
            - Brown bear, Ursus arctos LC
    - Superfamily: Musteloidea
      - Family: Mustelidae
        - Subfamily: Guloninae
          - Genus: Martes
            - Beech marten, Martes foina LC
            - European pine marten, Martes martes LC
        - Subfamily: Ictonychinae
          - Genus: Vormela
            - Marbled polecat, Vormela peregusna VU
        - Subfamily: Lutrinae
          - Genus: Lutra
            - Eurasian otter, Lutra lutra NT
        - Subfamily: Melinae
          - Genus: Meles
            - European badger, Meles meles LC
        - Subfamily: Mustelinae
          - Genus: Mustela
            - Stoat, Mustela erminea LC
            - Least weasel, Mustela nivalis LC
            - European polecat, Mustela putorius LC
  - Infraorder: Cynoidea
    - Family: Canidae
      - Subfamily: Caninae
        - Tribe: Canini
          - Subtribe: Canina
            - Genus: Canis
              - Grey wolf, Canis lupus LC
        - Tribe: Vulpini
          - Genus: Vulpes
            - Red fox, Vulpes vulpes LC
- Suborder: Feliformia
  - Superfamily: Feloidea
    - Family: Felidae
      - Subfamily: Felinae
        - Genus: Lynx
          - Balkan lynx, Lynx lynx balcanicus CR

== Order: Artiodactyla (even-toed ungulates) ==
- Clade: Artiofabula
  - Suborder: Suina
    - Infraorder: Suoidea
      - Family: Suidae
        - Subfamily: Suinae
          - Tribe: Suini
            - Genus: Sus
              - Wild boar, Sus scrofa LC
  - Suborder: Rumiantia
    - Clade: Bovimorpha
      - Infraorder: Cervoidea
        - Family: Cervidae
          - Subfamily: Capreolinae
            - Tribe: Capreolini
              - Genus: Capreolus
                - Western roe deer, Capreolus capreolus LC
          - Subfamily: Cervinae
            - Tribe: Cervini
              - Genus: Cervus
                - Red deer, Cervus elaphus LC

== See also ==
- Lists of mammals by region
- List of mammals of Croatia
- List of mammals of Bosnia and Herzegovina
- List of mammals of Serbia
- List of mammals of Albania
