= Yaeyama little horseshoe bat =

Conservation status
- Endangered (IUCN 3.1)

Scientific classification
- Kingdom: Animalia
- Phylum: Chordata
- Class: Mammalia
- Order: Chiroptera
- Family: Rhinolophidae
- Genus: Rhinolophus
- Species: R. perditus

Binomial name
- Rhinolophus perditus Andersen, 1918

Synonyms
- Rhinolophus cornutus perditus

Species of bat

The Yaeyama little horseshoe bat (Rhinolophus perditus) is a species of bat in the family Rhinolophidae that is endemic to the Yaeyama Islands of Japan.

== Taxonomy ==
Rhinolophus perditus was first described by Knud Andersen in 1918, based on a female specimen in the Natural History Museum that had been purchased by Alan Owston (B.M. no. 5.11.3.15); the type locality is given as "Ishigaki, southern Liu-Kiu", and its relatively large teeth are noted. Included in Mammal Species of the World (2005) as Rhinolophus cornutus perditus, i.e., as a subspecies of the Japanese little horseshoe bat, the Yaeyama little horseshoe bat is now treated as an independent species by authorities including the IUCN and the editors of Handbook of the Mammals of the World and Wild Mammals of Japan (2015), published under the auspices of the Mammal Society of Japan. The last two works also include Imaizumi's horseshoe bat (protonym, Rhinolophus imaizumii) as a subspecies of the Yaeyama little horseshoe bat, under the combination R. p. imaizumii. In its native Japan, the bat is known by the vernacular name Yaeyama kokikugashira-kōmori (ヤエヤマコキクガシラコウモリ).

Two subspecies are "tentatively" recognized:

- R. p. perditus Andersen, 1918 — Ishigaki Island, Taketomi Island
- R. p. imaizumii Hill & Yoshikuki, 1980 — Iriomote Island, Kohama Island

== Description ==
The bat's external morphology resembles that of the Japanese little horseshoe bat (Rhinolophus cornutus) and Okinawa little horseshoe bat (Rhinolophus pumilus), differences including a larger nose-leaf and skull length, and shorter tibia than the Okinawa little horseshoe bat. The constant frequency (CF) echolocation values of its calls are also lower than those of these other two species.

== Ecology ==
The Yaeyama little horseshoe bat is nocturnal and, though active all year round, is believed to hibernate but with frequent awakening in order to forage . It roosts in caves, often together with the Ryūkyū long-fingered bat (Miniopterus fuscus), as well as in abandoned mines, and old bomb shelters. The bat's diet consists of insects, in particular Lepidoptera (butterflies and moths), Coleoptera (beetles), Hymenoptera (bees, wasps, ants), and Diptera (flies), for which they forage mainly in areas of woodland. Females are monoestrous and form "maternity colonies" of several hundred to over a thousand individuals in May. They give birth to a single pup.

== Conservation status ==
The Yaeyama little horseshoe bat is classed as Endangered on the IUCN Red List. The principal threats are deforestation and habitat loss, destruction of their roosts, and disturbance by tourists.
