= Rhinolophus xinanzhongguoensis =

Conservation status
- Near Threatened (IUCN 3.1)

Scientific classification
- Kingdom: Animalia
- Phylum: Chordata
- Class: Mammalia
- Order: Chiroptera
- Family: Rhinolophidae
- Genus: Rhinolophus
- Species: R. xinanzhongguoensis

Binomial name
- Rhinolophus xinanzhongguoensis Zhou, Guillén-Servent, Lim, Eger, Wang & Jiang, 2009

Species of bat

Rhinolophus xinanzhongguoensis, the wedge-sellaed horseshoe bat or southwestern China horseshoe bat, is a species of horseshoe bat from China.

== Taxonomy and etymology ==
It was described as a new species in 2009 based on specimens collected in May 2005 and April 2006. One individual of the new species was collected in 2005, and a second was found in 2006. Later, three more individuals were identified in the mammal collections at Kunming Institute of Zoology that had been originally collected in 1963. Its species name xinanzhongguoensis is pronounced “shee-nan-joong-guo-en-sis.” The name xinanzhongguoensis was derived from the Pinyin words "west" (xi), "south" (nan), and "China" (Zhongguo), describing a species that can be found in southwestern China.

Analysis of mitochondrial DNA placed R. xinanzhongguoensis as the basal member of a clade containing Geoffroy's horseshoe bat, greater horseshoe bat, Ruwenzori horseshoe bat, Rüppell's horseshoe bat, and Darling's horseshoe bat. Phylogenetically, it belongs to the "Afro-Palearctic" lineage of the horseshoe bat family, as described by Guillén-Servent et al. in 2003. Species in the horseshoe bat genus are traditionally divided into "species groups"; Amador et al. stated that they believe that R. xinanzhongguoensis is so unique, it belongs in its species group.

== Description ==
It weighs 20–26 g (0.71–0.92 oz). It is considered a large member of its genus. Its dorsal fur is "dull medium brown" and its ventral fur is paler in color. Its flight membranes are dark brown. Its ears are brown, relatively small, and partly transparent. Near its base, the sides of the sella are parallel; it narrows to a wedge-shaped, rounded tip. The lancet is spear shaped. Its dental formula is typical for a horseshoe bat, at 1.1.2.32.1.3.3, for a total of 32 teeth. The length of its whole body is 59–70 mm (2.3–2.8 in); its forearm is 58.7–60.4 mm (2.31–2.38 in) long; its tail is 30–39 mm (1.2–1.5 in) long; its ear is 21–22 mm (0.83–0.87 in) long.

== Biology ==
It is nocturnal, sleeping in sheltered roosts during the day such as caves. It is known to roost with other horseshoe bats, including the intermediate horseshoe bat. Few individuals have been encountered, so little is known about its reproductive biology. However, a pregnant female was once encountered in April.

== Range and habitat ==
It occurs in wet habitat within the East Asian Monsoon zone. It has been documented at elevations of 1,500–1,980 m (4,920–6,500 ft) above sea level. All three areas where it has been documented are mountainous.

== Conservation ==
It is currently evaluated as near-threatened by the IUCN. It is only known from three localities and it has an estimated extent of occurrence of 26,865 km^{2} (10,373 mi^{2}). The habitat in areas where it does occur is severely fragmented, with ongoing declines in the extent and quality of the habitat. It is threatened by the disturbance of its roosts as caving tourism expands in China. Degradation of its habitat is also caused by logging and agricultural conversion.
