= Timorese horseshoe bat =

Conservation status
- Endangered (IUCN 3.1)

Scientific classification
- Kingdom: Animalia
- Phylum: Chordata
- Class: Mammalia
- Order: Chiroptera
- Family: Rhinolophidae
- Genus: Rhinolophus
- Species: R. montanus

Binomial name
- Rhinolophus montanus Goodwin, 1979
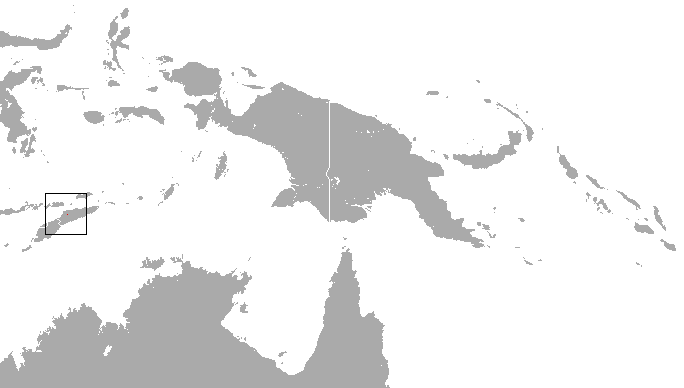
- Timorese horseshoe bat's range

Synonyms
- Rhinolophus philippinensis montanus Goodwin, 1979

Species of bat native to Timor-Leste

The Timorese horseshoe bat (Rhinolophus montanus) is a species of bat endemic to Timor-Leste.

== Taxonomy and etymology ==
It was described as a subspecies of the large-eared horseshoe bat by Robert Goodwin in 1979. Its trinomen was Rhinolophus philippinensis montanus. It was maintained as a subspecies until 2002, when Csorba argued that it was morphologically distinct enough to be considered a full species. Since this publication, it has consistently been considered its own species, Rhinolophus montanus. Its species name "montanus" is Latin in origin, meaning "montane". Goodwin chose this species name because the holotype was found at a high elevation of 1,220 m (4,000 ft) above sea level.

== Biology ==
It is nocturnal, roosting in sheltered places during the day such as caves. Unlike some bat species which are highly colonial, it roosts in small groups of perhaps six or seven individuals. When roosting, it prefers to hang from the ceilings of caves rather than in crevices. Individuals are well-spaced during roosting rather than clustered. It has been roosting with other species of bat, including Creagh's horseshoe bat, the western bent-winged bat, and the small bent-winged bat.

== Range and habitat ==
The holotype, paratype, and two additional specimens were all collected from Quoto Lou Caves in Timor-Leste, about 1,220 metres (4,000 ft) above sea level. These caves are not natural, and were excavated by the Japanese during their occupation of East Timor. The caves are located near Ermera. There have been additional acoustic detections near Laleia, Nino Konis Santana National Park, and Betano.

== Conservation ==
It is currently assessed as endangered by the IUCN, indicating that it is at risk of going extinct. It meets the criteria for this assessment because its area of occupancy is smaller than 500 km^{2} (190 sq mi), and it is threatened by habitat destruction and human disturbance of its roosts.
