= Sulawesi broad-eared horseshoe bat =

Conservation status
- Least Concern (IUCN 3.1)

Scientific classification
- Kingdom: Animalia
- Phylum: Chordata
- Class: Mammalia
- Order: Chiroptera
- Family: Rhinolophidae
- Genus: Rhinolophus
- Species: R. tatar

Binomial name
- Rhinolophus tatar Bergmans and Rozendaal, 1982

Species of bat

The Sulawesi broad-eared horseshoe bat or Tatar horseshoe bat (Rhinolophus tatar) is a species of horseshoe bat found in Sulawesi, Indonesia.

== Taxonomy and etymology ==
R. tatar was described as a new species in 1982 by Bergmans and Rozendaal. In 1992, Hill published that it was synonymous with the broad-eared horseshoe bat, R. euryotis. In 2013, a morphological and genetic analysis concluded that R. tatar was distinct from the broad-eared horseshoe bat. The species name "tatar" is a portmanteau derived from the names of George Henry Hamilton Tate and Richard Archbold. Tate and Archbold's 1939 publication "Oriental Rhinolophus, with special reference to material from the Archbold Collections" "presumably recognized Rhinolophus tatar as a species . . . only through an error, they attached a wrong name to it."

== Description ==
R. tatar has a forearm length of 48.7–51.8 mm (1.92–2.04 in). It has large, triangular ears that are longer than they are wide. Its fur is dense and woolly. Individual hairs are bicolored: on the back, they have white bases and dark brown tips, while on the belly they have white bases and medium-brown tips.

== Biology and ecology ==
R. tatar is insectivorous, gleaning prey from foliage or hawking them from the air. It possibly roosts in caves, though it is more likely that it roosts in trees. It is known to be affected by ectoparasites including two families of bat flies: Nycteribiidae (genus Stylidia) and Streblidae. It has also been documented with mites.

== Range and habitat ==
It is endemic to Indonesia, where it has only been found on the island of Sulawesi.
