= Rhinolophus hilli =

Conservation status
- Endangered (IUCN 3.1)

Scientific classification
- Kingdom: Animalia
- Phylum: Chordata
- Class: Mammalia
- Infraclass: Placentalia
- Order: Chiroptera
- Family: Rhinolophidae
- Genus: Rhinolophus
- Species: R. hilli

Binomial name
- Rhinolophus hilli Aellen, 1973
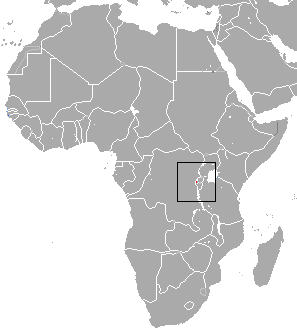
- Hill's horseshoe bat range

Species of bat

Rhinolophus hilli, Hill's horseshoe bat, is a species of bat in the family Rhinolophidae. It is endemic to Rwanda. Its natural habitats are subtropical or tropical moist montane forests, caves, and subterranean habitats (other than caves). In 2013, Bat Conservation International listed this species as one of the 35 species of its worldwide priority list of conservation. It is threatened by habitat loss.

== Taxonomy ==
As the genus Rhinolophus is quite speciose, it is split into groups. Maclaud's horseshoe bat is the identifier of one of these groups, called the maclaudi group, which currently consists of six species, three of which were not described before 2003. Members of this group have large ears, and a diminished connection between the sella and lancet.

- Maclaud's horseshoe bat—R. maclaudi
- Rhinolophus willardi—discovered in 2013
- Ruwenzori horseshoe bat— R. ruwenzorii
- Hill's horseshoe bat—R. hilli
- Rhinolophus kahuzi—discovered in 2013
- Ziama horseshoe bat—R. ziama

R. maclaudi and R. ziama are considered the two West African taxa, while the other four species are found further east around the Albertine Rift. The West African species are larger in size than the East African species, with R. maclaudi as the largest bat of the species group. As these species are very similar morphologically, it was previously thought that R. hilli and R. ruwenzorii were the same taxon, and that the taxon was a subspecies of the Maclaud's horseshoe bat.

== Conservation ==
The first two individuals of this species were encountered in 1964 and 1981. The locations of the two individuals were only 8 km (5 mi) apart. It is unknown where this species roosts during the day. The IUCN lists this species as endangered, due to a small range of occurrence of less than 100 km^{2} (39 mi^{2}), habitat destruction, a small number of subpopulations, and over-harvesting for bushmeat. In 2019, Hill's horseshoe bat was documented again for the first time since 1981, when single individual was found in Nyungwe National Park in Rwanda. Its calls were recorded, and the species has since been acoustically identified at eight other sites in the area.
