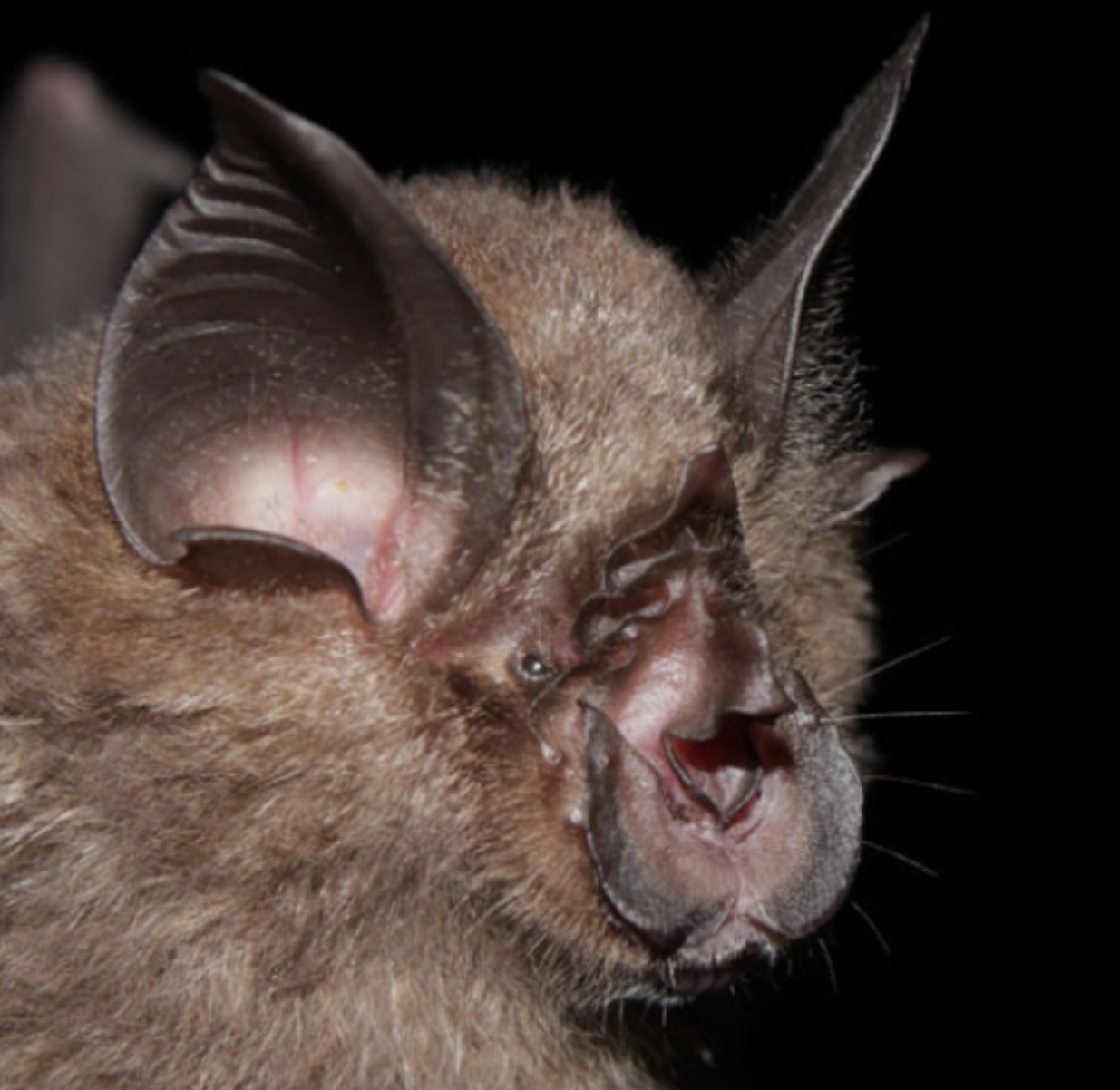

Conservation status
- Near Threatened (IUCN 3.1)

Scientific classification
- Kingdom: Animalia
- Phylum: Chordata
- Class: Mammalia
- Order: Chiroptera
- Family: Rhinolophidae
- Genus: Rhinolophus
- Species: R. robinsoni

Binomial name
- Rhinolophus robinsoni K. Andersen, 1918
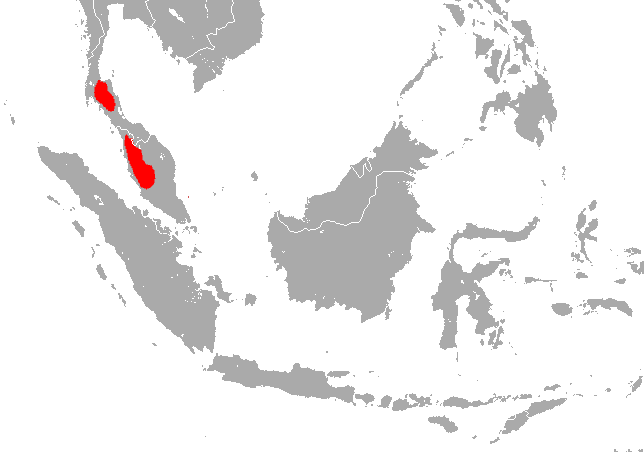
- Peninsular horseshoe bat's range

= Peninsular horseshoe bat =

Species of bat

The Peninsular horseshoe bat or Robinson's Horseshoe Bat (Rhinolophus robinsoni) is a species of horseshoe bat found in Malaysia and Thailand. The name "horseshoe bat" derives from the distinctive horseshoe-shaped flaps at the lower part of its nose-leaf.

== Taxonomy ==
The peninsular horseshoe bat was first described as a new species by Knud Andersen in 1918, which he placed in the megaphyllus species group. It was often considered a synonym or subspecies of the smaller horseshoe bat, but genetic and morphological data suggests it should be treated as a distinct species.

== Description ==
The peninsular horseshoe bat is a small to medium-sized horseshoe bat, with a head to body length of 47–55 mm, a forearm length of 40–46 mm and a weight ranging 6 to 13 grams. The ears are large, measuring from 16 to 23 mm, tapered at the ends, and have an antitragus although lacking a tragus, which is typical for horseshoe bats. As with other rhinolophids, the complex shape of the nose-leaf adorned with intricate folds and furrows is thought to aid in shaping and modifying its echolocation calls. The echolocation calls range from 64 to 68 kHz.

== Habitat and Ecology ==
This species occurs in mixed pristine deciduous forests and lowland dipterocarp forests in Thailand, and in Malaysia it is mostly found in lowland and hill forests. It likely primarily roosts in small groups, and has been found to roost in crevices in rocks and in palms in the forest understory. Little is known about its ecology overall.

== Conservation ==
The peninsular horseshoe bat is a rare species, being infrequently recorded in its respective range. Attempts of capturing the species around disturbed habitats in Thailand have had no success. The IUCN Red List classifies this species as Near Threatened due to its dependence on forests and widespread habitat degradation through most of its range, which is a major threat to the species. It has been extirpated from its type locality in Surat Thani province, although some populations still occur in protected areas in Thailand and Malaysia.
