= Rhinolophus chutamasae =

Scientific classification
- Kingdom: Animalia
- Phylum: Chordata
- Class: Mammalia
- Order: Chiroptera
- Family: Rhinolophidae
- Subfamily: Rhinolophinae
- Genus: Rhinolophus
- Species: R. chutamasae

Binomial name
- Rhinolophus chutamasae Soisook & Bates, 2022
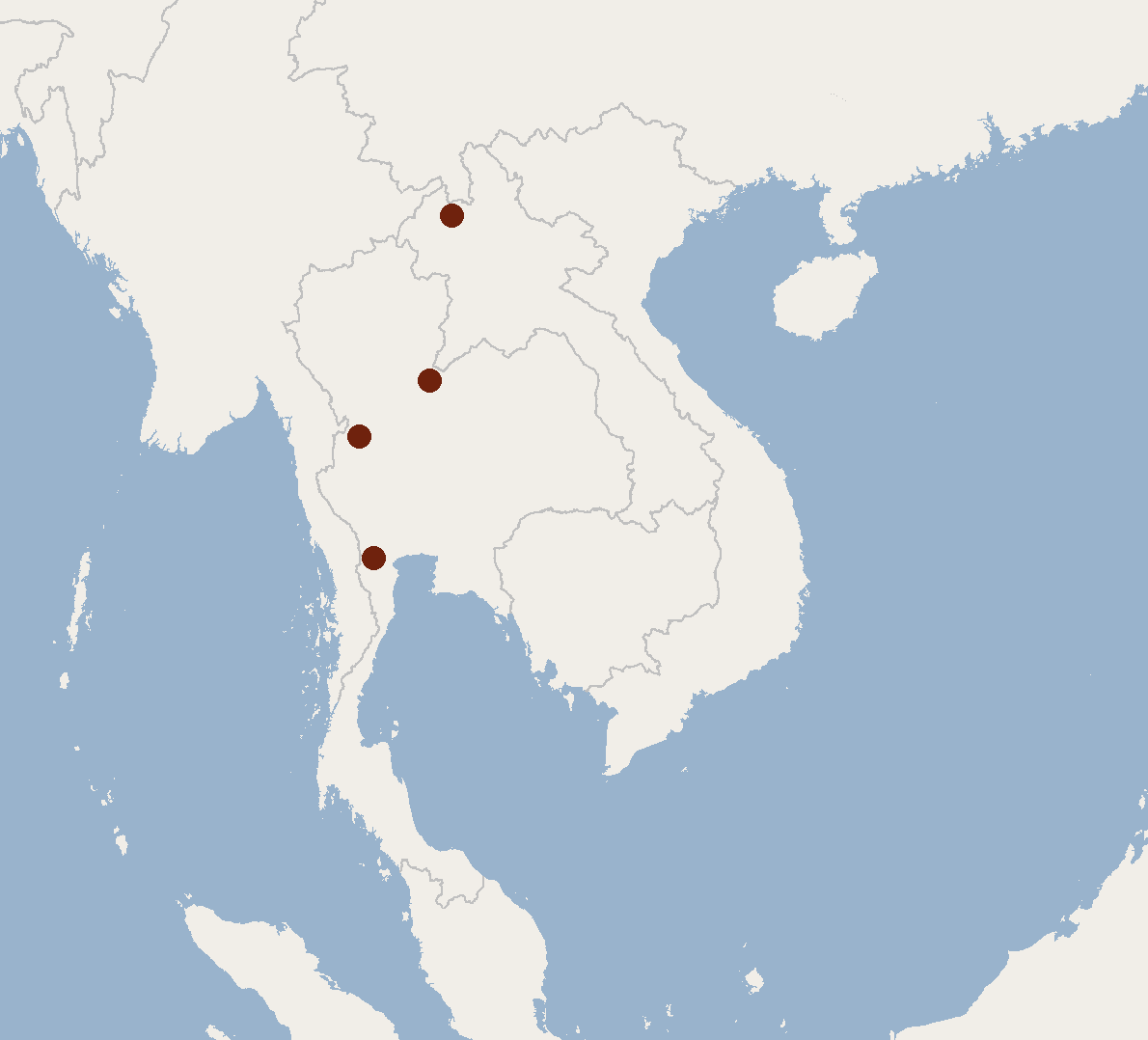
- Distribution of R. chutamasae

Species of bat

Rhinolophus chutamasae or the mountain horseshoe bat is a species of bat in the family Rhinolophidae. It is found from Greater Mekong in Southeast Asia.

== Taxonomy ==
Rhinolophus chutamasae was initially described with the name Rhinolophus monticolus. However, this name was judged a junior homonym of an older name, Rhinolophus monticola (Andersen, 1905), as monticola and monticolus are sufficiently similar. Rhinolophus monticola was described in 1905, and thus has priority over the species name. Therefore, a replacement name was chosen for R. monticolus: Rhinolophus chutamasae.

== Description ==
Small bat, with the length of the head and body between 42.3 and 48.5 mm, the length of the forearm between 41.2 and 44.1 mm, the length of the tail between 19.7 and 25.6 mm, the length of the foot between 7.4 and 8.6 mm, the length of the ears between 15.5 and 48.5 mm.

The backbone parts are dark brown, while the ventral parts are lighter. The base of the hair is complete white. The nasal leaf is brown and has a high lancet, with a blunt tip and concave margins, a relatively long connective process, pointed and projected forward, the wide saddle, with parallel edges and the square end. In some individuals the nasal leaf is coated with a layer of orange liquid with an unknown function. The lower lip has three longitudinal furrows. The tail is long and completely included in the wide uropatagium. The second lower premolar is very small and rounded.

== Distribution and habitat ==
This species is widespread in central-western and northern Thailand and northern Laos.

It lives in the mountain evergreen forests between 620 and 1.320 meters of altitude.
