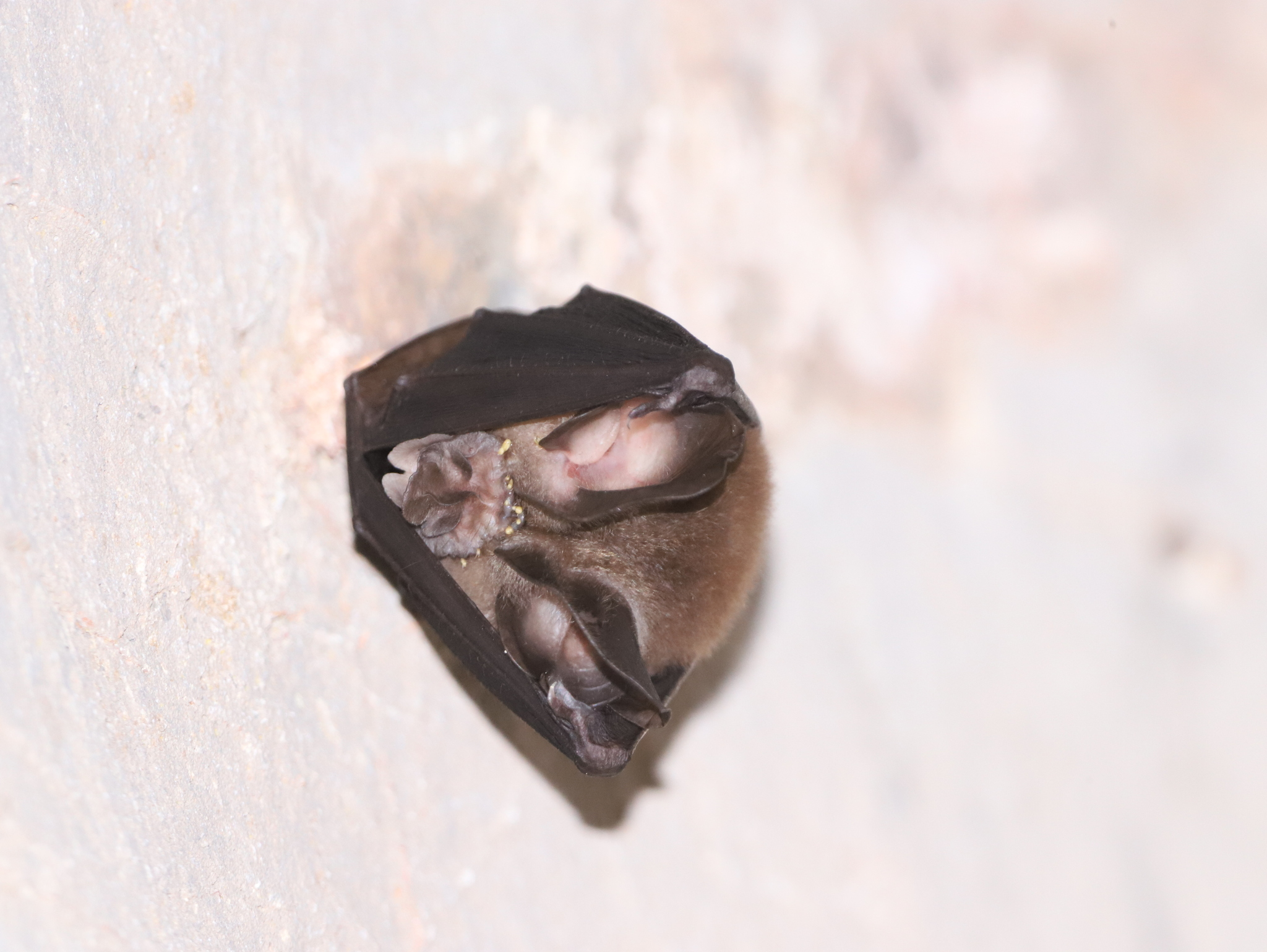

Conservation status
- Endangered (IUCN 3.1)

Scientific classification
- Kingdom: Animalia
- Phylum: Chordata
- Class: Mammalia
- Infraclass: Placentalia
- Order: Chiroptera
- Family: Rhinolophidae
- Genus: Rhinolophus
- Species: R. rex

Binomial name
- Rhinolophus rex G. M. Allen, 1923
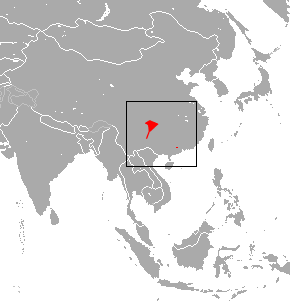
- King horseshoe bat range

= King horseshoe bat =

Species of bat

The king horseshoe bat (Rhinolophus rex) is a species of bat in the family Rhinolophidae. It is endemic to the east coast of China.
