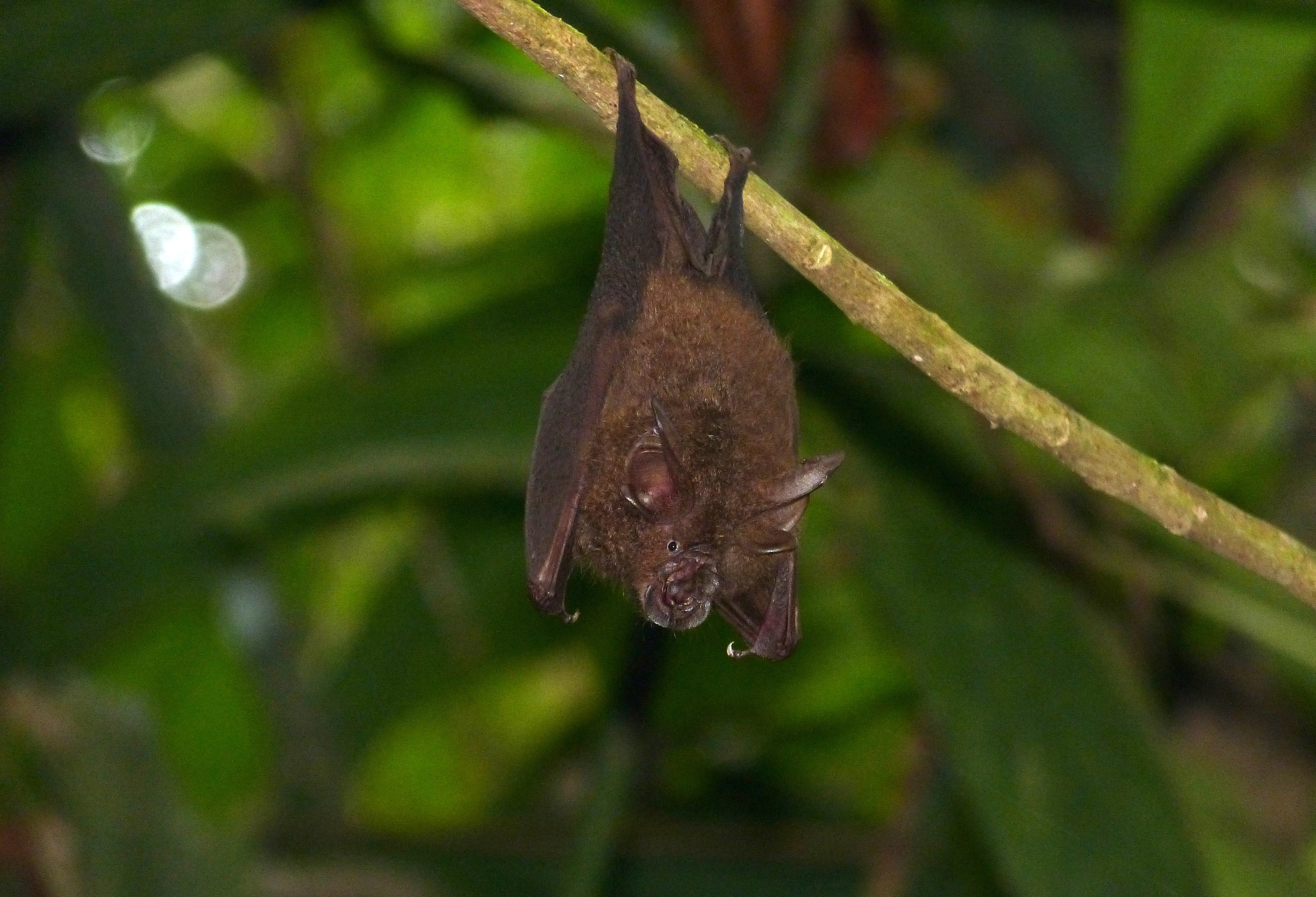

Scientific classification
- Kingdom: Animalia
- Phylum: Chordata
- Class: Mammalia
- Order: Chiroptera
- Family: Rhinolophidae
- Genus: Rhinolophus
- Species: R. francisi

Binomial name
- Rhinolophus francisi Soisook, Struebig, Bates & Miguez, 2015

= Francis's woolly horseshoe bat =

Species of bat

Francis's wooly horseshoe bat (Rhinolophus francisi) is a species of bat in the family Rhinolophidae found in Malaysia and Thailand. It was named in honor of Charles M. Francis.
