= Damara horseshoe bat =

Conservation status
- Least Concern (IUCN 3.1)

Scientific classification
- Kingdom: Animalia
- Phylum: Chordata
- Class: Mammalia
- Order: Chiroptera
- Family: Rhinolophidae
- Genus: Rhinolophus
- Species: R. damarensis

Binomial name
- Rhinolophus damarensis Roberts, 1946

Species of bat

The Damara horseshoe bat (Rhinolophus damarensis), is a species of bat found in Africa.

== Taxonomy and etymology ==
It was described as a subspecies of Darling's horseshoe bat in 1946 by South African zoologist Austin Roberts. It was largely maintained as a subspecies of Darling's horseshoe bat until 2013, when it was shown to be genetically distinct. Its species name "damarensis" means "belonging to Damara." Roberts was possibly referencing Damaraland in Namibia.

== Biology and ecology ==
It is nocturnal, roosting in sheltered places during the day such as caves and mines, particularly asbestos and gold mines. It is a social species, forming colonies that generally consist of fewer than 100 individuals.

== Range and status ==
It is found in the eastern half of Southern Africa, with its range including Angola, Namibia, and South Africa.

It is currently assessed as least concern by the IUCN—its lowest conservation priority. Potential threats to this species include habitat loss; the old mines that it uses as roosts are subject to disturbance if and when they are reopened. Its range includes protected areas, such as ǀAi-ǀAis/Richtersveld Transfrontier Park and Augrabies Falls National Park.
