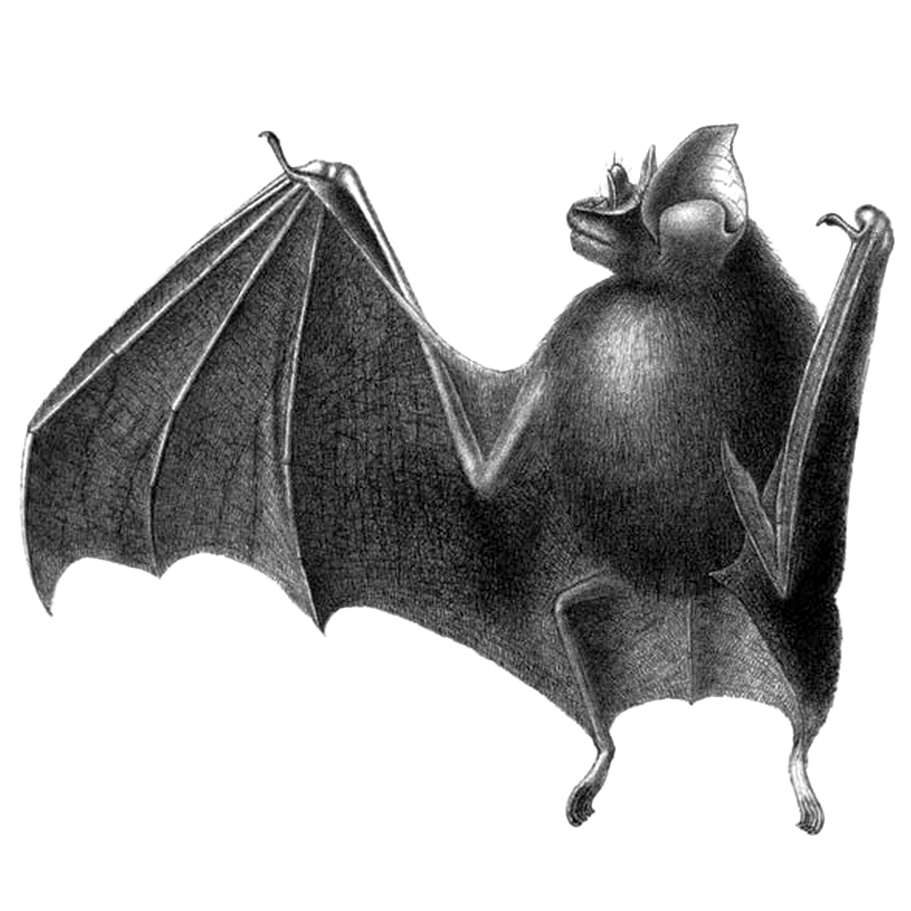

Conservation status
- Least Concern (IUCN 3.1)

Scientific classification
- Kingdom: Animalia
- Phylum: Chordata
- Class: Mammalia
- Order: Chiroptera
- Family: Rhinolophidae
- Genus: Rhinolophus
- Species: R. euryotis

Binomial name
- Rhinolophus euryotis Temminck, 1835
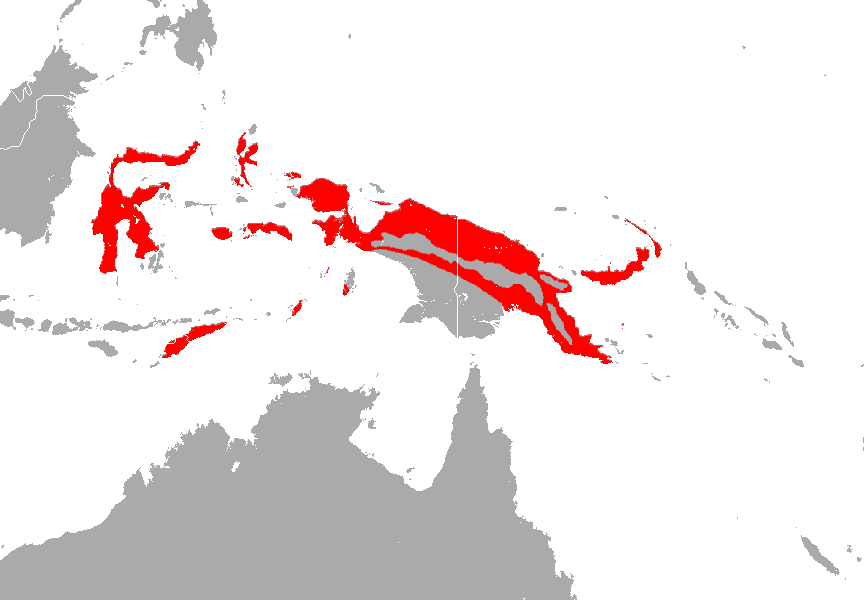
- Broad-eared horseshoe bat range

= Broad-eared horseshoe bat =

Species of bat

The broad-eared horseshoe bat (Rhinolophus euryotis) is a species of bat in the family Rhinolophidae. It is found in Indonesia, Papua New Guinea, and Timor-Leste.
