= Guinean horseshoe bat =

Conservation status
- Endangered (IUCN 3.1)

Scientific classification
- Kingdom: Animalia
- Phylum: Chordata
- Class: Mammalia
- Order: Chiroptera
- Family: Rhinolophidae
- Genus: Rhinolophus
- Species: R. guineensis

Binomial name
- Rhinolophus guineensis Eisentraut, 1960
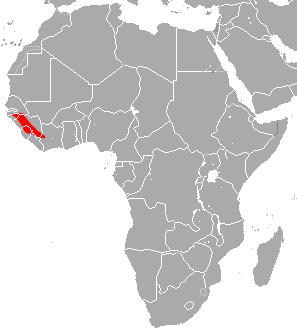
- Guinean horseshoe bat range

Species of bat

The Guinean horseshoe bat (Rhinolophus guineensis) is a species of bat in the family Rhinolophidae. It is found in Ivory Coast, Guinea, Liberia, Senegal, and Sierra Leone. Its natural habitats are subtropical and tropical forests, moist savanna, caves, and other subterranean habitats.

== Taxonomy and etymology ==
It was described by M. Eisentraut in 1960 as a new subspecies of the Lander's horseshoe bat with a trinomen of Rhinolophus landeri guineensis. The holotype was collected near Kolenté, Guinea. In 1978, it was elevated to full species status.

== Description ==
It is considered "medium-sized" for an African horseshoe bat. Its forearm length is 44–50 mm (1.7–2.0 in) and individuals weigh 8–11 g (0.28–0.39 oz). Its dental formula is 1.1.2.32.1.3.3 for a total of 32 teeth.

== Range and habitat ==
Its range includes several countries in West Africa such as Ivory Coast, Guinea, Liberia, Senegal, and Sierra Leone. It is found in high elevations greater than 1,400 m (4,600 ft) above sea level.

== Conservation ==
As of 2008, it is listed as an endangered species by the IUCN.
