= Bushveld horseshoe bat =

Conservation status
- Least Concern (IUCN 3.1)

Scientific classification
- Kingdom: Animalia
- Phylum: Chordata
- Class: Mammalia
- Order: Chiroptera
- Family: Rhinolophidae
- Genus: Rhinolophus
- Species: R. simulator

Binomial name
- Rhinolophus simulator K. Andersen, 1904
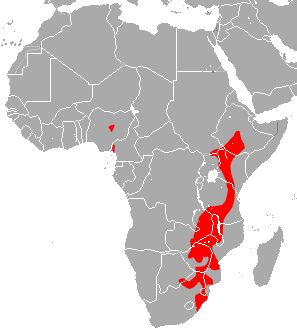
- Bushveld horseshoe bat range

Species of bat

The Bushveld horseshoe bat (Rhinolophus simulator) is a species of bat in the family Rhinolophidae. It is found in Botswana, Cameroon, Ivory Coast, Eswatini, Ethiopia, Guinea, Kenya, Liberia, Malawi, Mozambique, Nigeria, South Africa, South Sudan, Tanzania, Zambia, and Zimbabwe. Its natural habitats are moist savanna, caves and other subterranean habitats.
