= Imaizumi's horseshoe bat =

Conservation status
- Least Concern (IUCN 3.1)

Scientific classification
- Kingdom: Animalia
- Phylum: Chordata
- Class: Mammalia
- Order: Chiroptera
- Family: Rhinolophidae
- Genus: Rhinolophus
- Species: R. imaizumii

Binomial name
- Rhinolophus imaizumii Hill & Yoshiyuki, 1980

Species of bat

Imaizumi's horseshoe bat (Rhinolophus imaizumii) is a species of bat in the family Rhinolophidae. It is endemic to Japan. Its natural habitat is temperate forests. While it was formerly considered endangered by the IUCN, it is now considered synonymous with the least horseshoe bat, which is evaluated as least concern.
