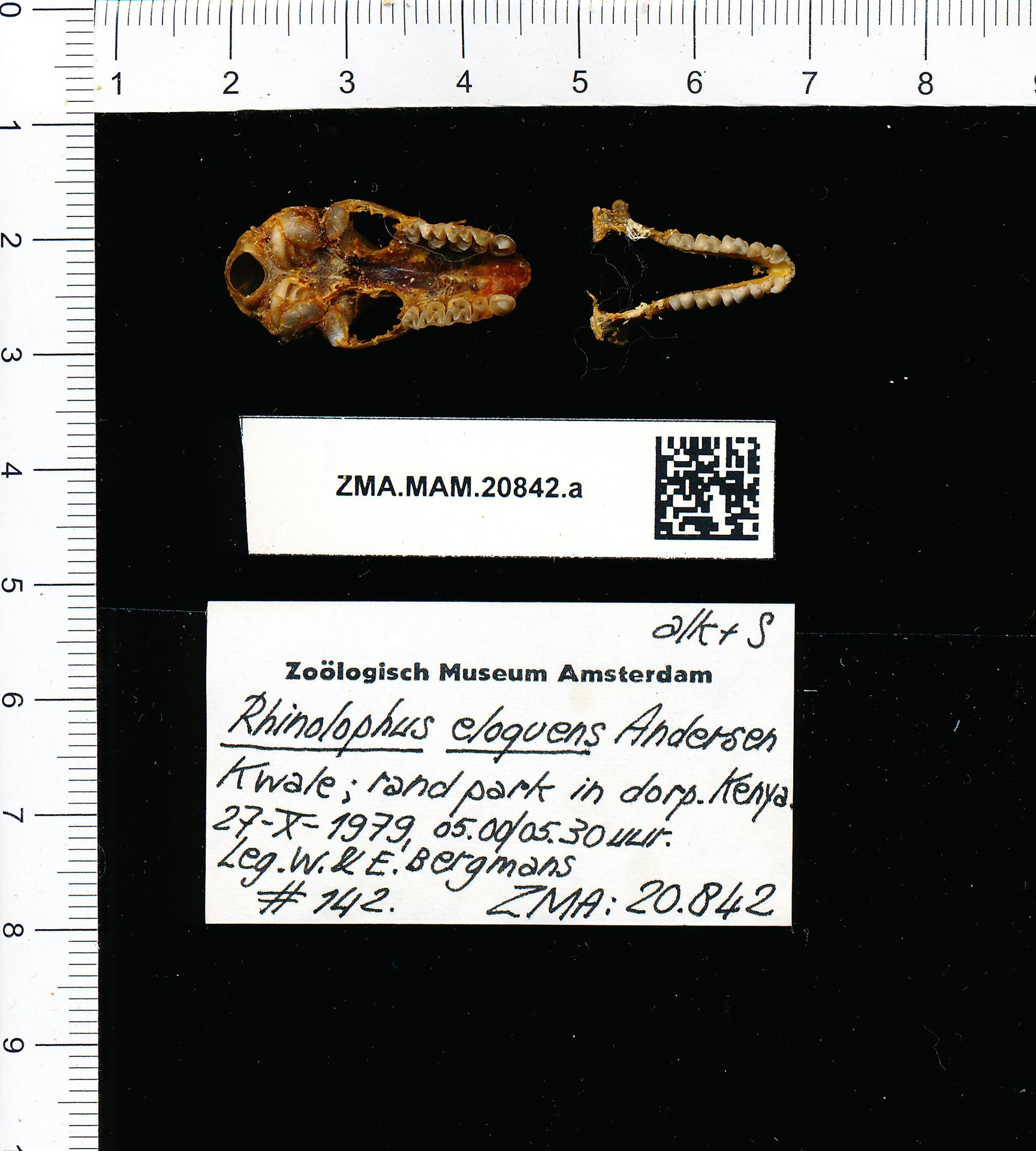
- skull of Rhinolophus eloquens

Conservation status
- Least Concern (IUCN 3.1)

Scientific classification
- Kingdom: Animalia
- Phylum: Chordata
- Class: Mammalia
- Order: Chiroptera
- Family: Rhinolophidae
- Genus: Rhinolophus
- Species: R. eloquens

Binomial name
- Rhinolophus eloquens K. Andersen, 1905
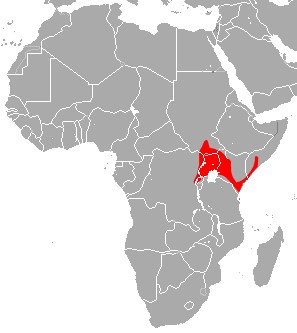
- Eloquent horseshoe bat range

= Eloquent horseshoe bat =

Species of bat

The eloquent horseshoe bat (Rhinolophus eloquens) is a species of bat in the family Rhinolophidae. It is found in Ethiopia, Kenya, Rwanda, Somalia, South Sudan, Tanzania, and Uganda. Its natural habitats are subtropical or tropical moist lowland forests, dry savanna, moist savanna, and caves.

== Taxonomy ==
The eloquent horseshoe bat was described as a new species in 1905 by Danish mammalogist Knud Andersen. The holotype had been collected in Entebbe, Uganda.
