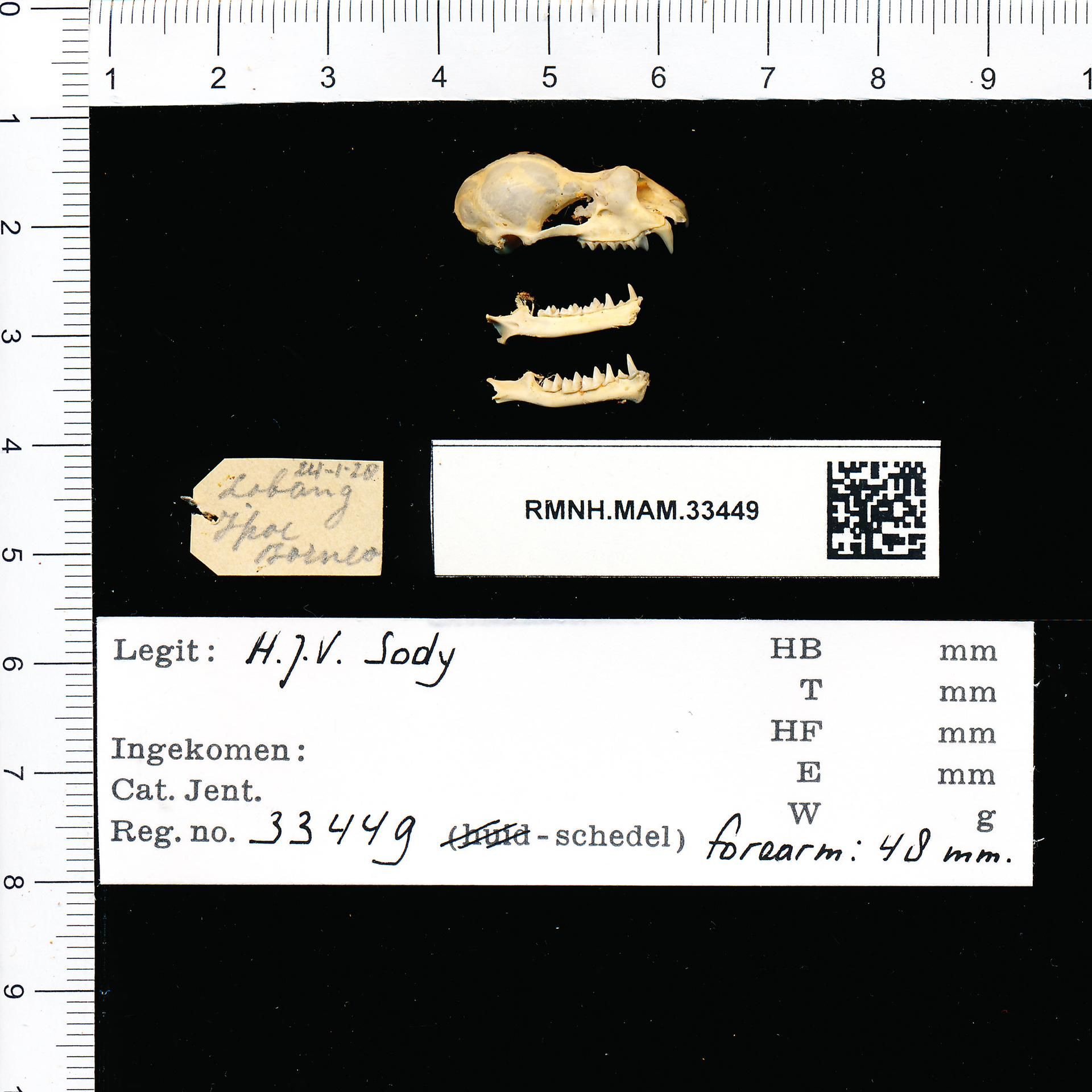
- Skull of a female Rhinolophus creaghi

Conservation status
- Least Concern (IUCN 3.1)

Scientific classification
- Kingdom: Animalia
- Phylum: Chordata
- Class: Mammalia
- Order: Chiroptera
- Family: Rhinolophidae
- Genus: Rhinolophus
- Species: R. creaghi

Binomial name
- Rhinolophus creaghi Thomas, 1896
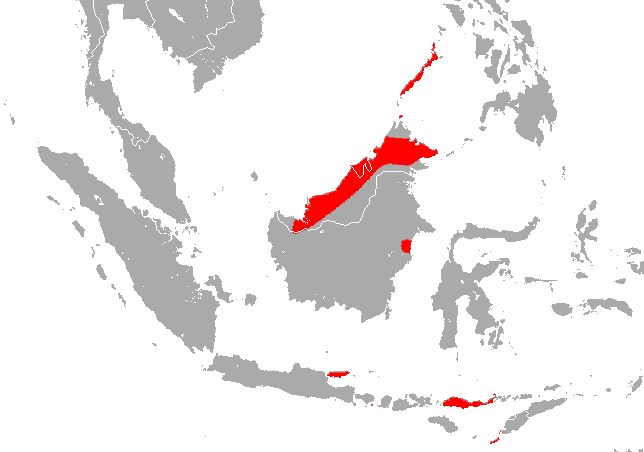
- Creagh's horseshoe bat range

= Creagh's horseshoe bat =

Species of bat

Creagh's horseshoe bat (Rhinolophus creaghi) is a species of bat in the family Rhinolophidae. It is found in Indonesia and Malaysia.
