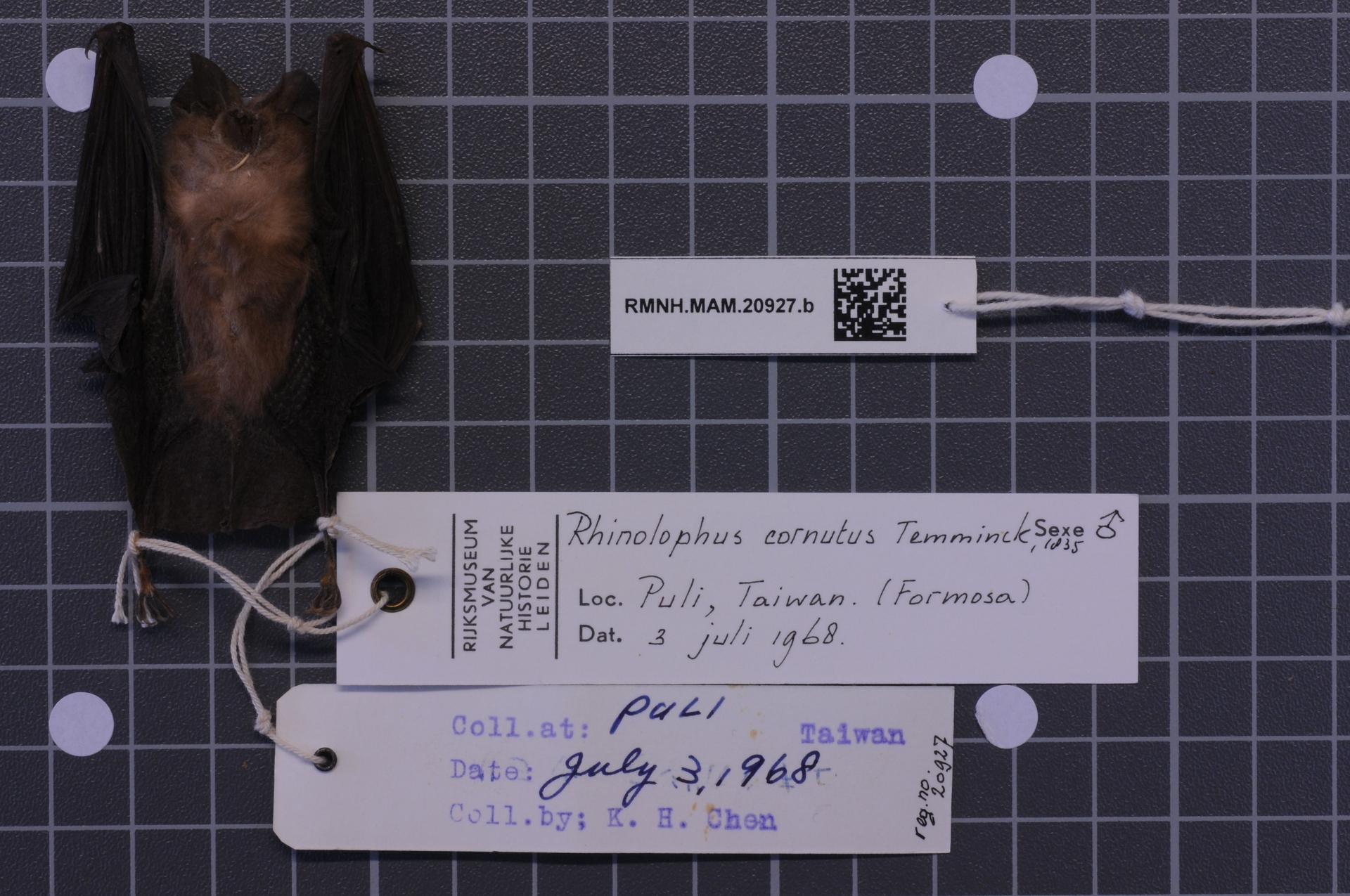

Scientific classification
- Domain: Eukaryota
- Kingdom: Animalia
- Phylum: Chordata
- Class: Mammalia
- Order: Chiroptera
- Family: Rhinolophidae
- Genus: Rhinolophus
- Species: R. cornutus

Binomial name
- Rhinolophus cornutus Temminck, 1835

= Little Japanese horseshoe bat =

Species of bat

The little Japanese horseshoe bat (Rhinolophus cornutus) is a species of bat in the family Rhinolophidae. It is found in Japan and possibly China. Its natural habitat is temperate forests. As of 2012, it had not yet been assessed for the IUCN Red List.
