= Kahuzi horseshoe bat =

Conservation status
- Endangered (IUCN 3.1)

Scientific classification
- Kingdom: Animalia
- Phylum: Chordata
- Class: Mammalia
- Order: Chiroptera
- Family: Rhinolophidae
- Genus: Rhinolophus
- Species: R. kahuzi

Binomial name
- Rhinolophus kahuzi Kerbis Peterhans & Fahr, 2013

Species of African bat

The Kahuzi horseshoe bat (Rhinolophus kahuzi) is a species of bat in the family Rhinolophidae, found in eastern Democratic Republic of the Congo. It is named after Mount Kahuzi.
