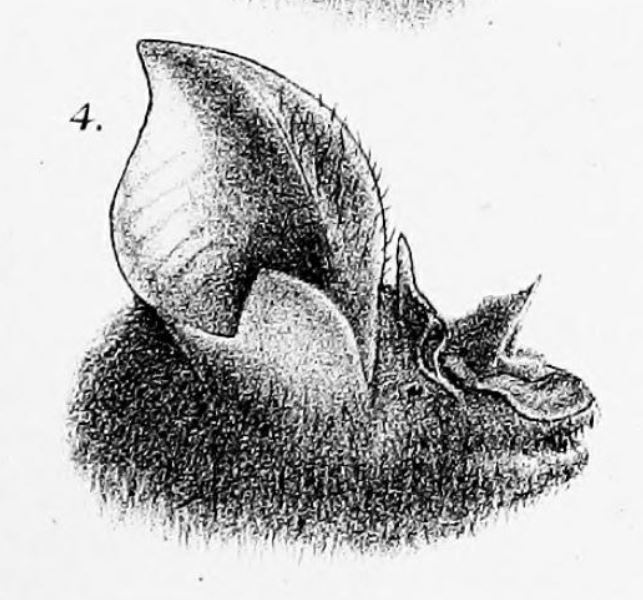

Conservation status
- Least Concern (IUCN 3.1)

Scientific classification
- Kingdom: Animalia
- Phylum: Chordata
- Class: Mammalia
- Order: Chiroptera
- Family: Rhinolophidae
- Genus: Rhinolophus
- Species: R. philippinensis

Binomial name
- Rhinolophus philippinensis Waterhouse, 1843
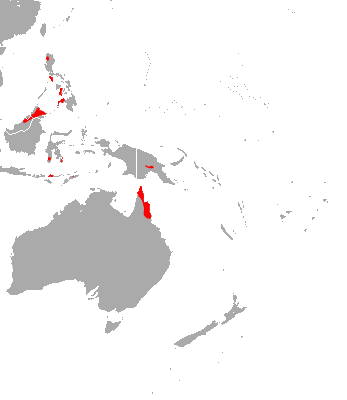
- Large-eared horseshoe bat range

= Large-eared horseshoe bat =

Species of bat

The large-eared horseshoe bat (Rhinolophus philippinensis) is a species of bat in the family Rhinolophidae. It is found in humid caves in Australia, Indonesia, Malaysia, Papua New Guinea, the Philippines, and Timor-Leste. It is an insectivore. Its larger variant is Rhinolophus robertsi, which is sympatric to philippinensis.
