= Hills' horseshoe bat =

Conservation status
- Vulnerable (IUCN 3.1)

Scientific classification
- Kingdom: Animalia
- Phylum: Chordata
- Class: Mammalia
- Order: Chiroptera
- Family: Rhinolophidae
- Genus: Rhinolophus
- Species: R. hillorum

Binomial name
- Rhinolophus hillorum Koopman, 1989
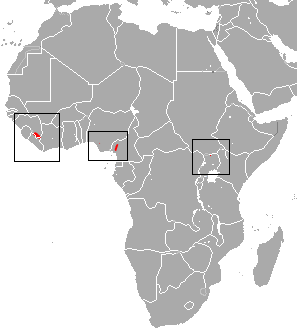
- Hill's horseshoe bat range

Species of bat

The Hills' horseshoe bat (Rhinolophus hillorum) is a species of bat in the family Rhinolophidae. It is found in Cameroon, Guinea, Liberia, and Nigeria. Its natural habitats are subtropical and tropical moist lowland and montane forest, caves and other subterranean habitats.

== Taxonomy ==
Hills' horseshoe bat was first described as a new subspecies of Geoffroy's horseshoe bat with a trinomen of Rhinolophus clivosus hillorum in 1989. The holotype had been collected near Voinjama, Liberia. It was first recognized as a full species in 2002. The eponyms for the species name "hillorum" were the unrelated mammalogists John Eric Hill and John Edwards Hill.

== Description ==
Hills' horseshoe bat has a forearm length of 52–57 mm (2.0–2.2 in), and individuals weigh 16.5–25 g (0.58–0.88 oz). It has a dental formula of 1.1.1.32.1.2.3 for a total of 28 teeth.

== Range and habitat ==
Hills' horseshoe bat is found in Western and Central Africa, where it has been confirmed in Cameroon, Guinea, Liberia, Nigeria. Its presence is possible yet unconfirmed in Uganda as of 2010.

== Conservation ==
As of 2022, it is evaluated as vulnerable by the IUCN. It meets the criteria for this classification because it is experiencing habitat destruction. Its extent of occurrence is likely less than 20,000 km^{2} (7,700 mi^{2}). It likely has a small population size which is also declining. Specific threats this species faces include mining, quarrying, deforestation, and hunting.
