= Rhinolophus willardi =

Conservation status
- Endangered (IUCN 3.1)

Scientific classification
- Kingdom: Animalia
- Phylum: Chordata
- Class: Mammalia
- Order: Chiroptera
- Family: Rhinolophidae
- Genus: Rhinolophus
- Species: R. willardi

Binomial name
- Rhinolophus willardi Kerbis Peterhans & Fahr, 2013

Species of bat

Willard's horseshoe bat (Rhinolophus willardi) is a newly described species of bat in the family Rhinolophidae. It is endemic to a small area in the Democratic Republic of the Congo. It is listed as endangered by the IUCN Red List.

== Taxonomy ==
The holotype was captured near a stream in a deep valley. The surrounding forest is dense and composed of tall trees about 40–50 m tall and had an open understory.

It is part of the Rhinolophus maclaudi species group.

The species epithet honours Dr. David Willard for his contribution to bat conservation.

== Habitat and distribution ==
The species has only been recorded from two capture sites in the Misotschi-Kabogo highlands in the South Kivu province off the shore of Lake Tanganyika in the Democratic Republic of the Congo. The specimens were captured at elevations of 1,880 m and 1,950 m in montane forest. It probably roosts in caves and mines.

== Conservation ==
The species is very poorly documented and no information exists on its population. However, the area it has been recorded in is unstable due to regional conflict and is affected by unregulated forest clearing, habitat degradation, and roost disturbance. The species is also probably affected by hunting of roosting bats, which is a common regional practice in its range.
