= Ruwenzori horseshoe bat =

Conservation status
- Endangered (IUCN 3.1)

Scientific classification
- Kingdom: Animalia
- Phylum: Chordata
- Class: Mammalia
- Order: Chiroptera
- Family: Rhinolophidae
- Genus: Rhinolophus
- Species: R. ruwenzorii

Binomial name
- Rhinolophus ruwenzorii Hill, 1942
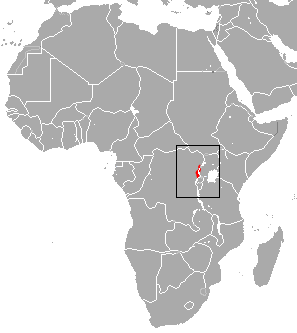
- Ruwenzori horseshoe bat range

Species of bat

The Ruwenzori horseshoe bat (Rhinolophus ruwenzorii) is a species of bat in the family Rhinolophidae. It is found in Democratic Republic of the Congo, Rwanda, and Uganda. Its natural habitats are subtropical or tropical moist lowland forest and swamps, caves and other subterranean habitats.
