= Convex horseshoe bat =

Conservation status
- Data Deficient (IUCN 3.1)

Scientific classification
- Kingdom: Animalia
- Phylum: Chordata
- Class: Mammalia
- Order: Chiroptera
- Family: Rhinolophidae
- Genus: Rhinolophus
- Species: R. convexus

Binomial name
- Rhinolophus convexus Csorba, 1997
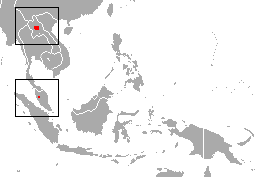
- Convex Horseshoe Bat range

Species of bat

The convex horseshoe bat (Rhinolophus convexus) is a species of bat in the family Rhinolophidae. It is found in Malaysia and Laos.

== Discovery and etymology ==
This species was first encountered by Hungarian zoologists Gábor Csorba and Ferenc Zilahy in March 1995 in the Cameron Highlands District of Malaysia. It was described by Csorba in 1997. It was given the species name convexus in reference to the "convex outline of the posterior noseleaf." The holotype is an adult female.

== Taxonomy ==
As the Rhinolophus genus is quite speciose, it is divided into closely related species groups. The convex horseshoe bat is placed into the pusillus species group.

Other species belonging to this species group include:

- Acuminate horseshoe bat, R. acuminatus
- Little Japanese horseshoe bat, R. cornutus
- Imaizumi's horseshoe bat, R. imaizumii
- Blyth's horseshoe bat, R. lepidus
- Formosan lesser horseshoe bat, R. monoceros
- Osgood's horseshoe bat, R. osgoodi
- Least horseshoe bat, R. pusillus
- Shortridge's horseshoe bat, R. shortridgei
- Little Nepalese horseshoe bat, R. subbadius

== Description ==
The base of the noseleaf is narrow when viewed from the side. The lancet is short, wide, and rounded with convex margins. Its shape is similar to an equilateral triangle. The sella tapers and curves downward at the tip. The forearms are approximately 42 mm (1.7 in) long. Ears are small and blunted at the tip. The noseleaf, while broad, does not cover the sides of the muzzle. There are three grooves in its lower lip. On its back, the fur is a rich, russet brown color, and individual hairs are 6 mm (0.24 in) long. Hairs are a consistent color from base to tip. On its ventral side, the hairs are lighter in color, and individual hairs are somewhat shorter at 4.5 mm (0.18 in) long. Flight membranes are dark in color. The last vertebra of the tail extends slightly past the uropatagium.

== Range and habitat ==
One individual was collected in a montane forest of Malaysia at 1,600 m (5,200 ft). The other known individual was collected in front of a cave in Laos, but its taxonomic validity may be questionable.

== Conservation ==
Only two individuals of this species have ever been observed. There is almost no information about their biology, ecology, population number, or range. Because of this, the IUCN lists it as data deficient.
