= List of mammals of the Andaman and Nicobar Islands =

This article is a list of mammal species found in the Andaman and Nicobar Islands. There are 60 species of mammals in the Andaman and Nicobar Islands. This list uses British English throughout.

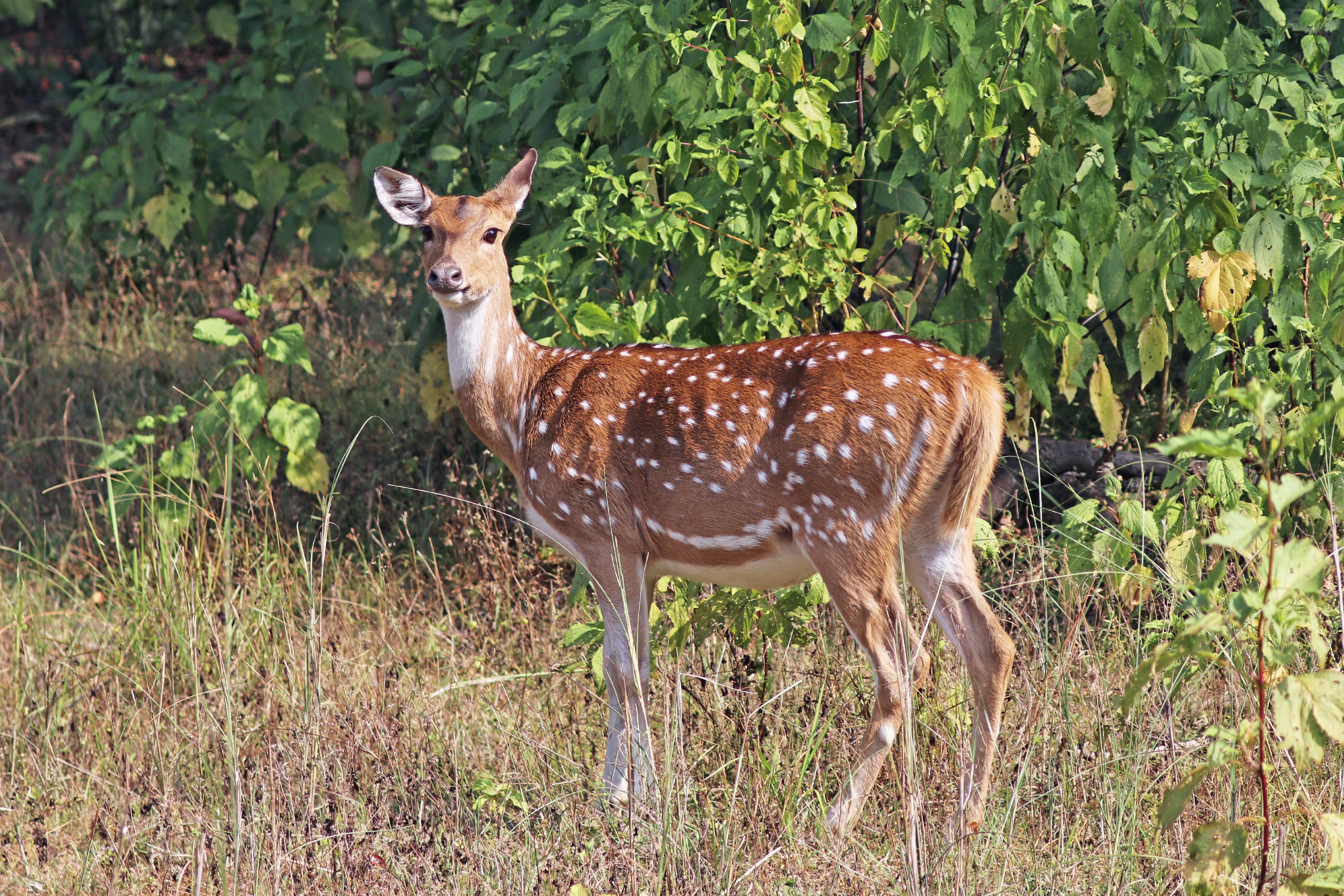
Chital

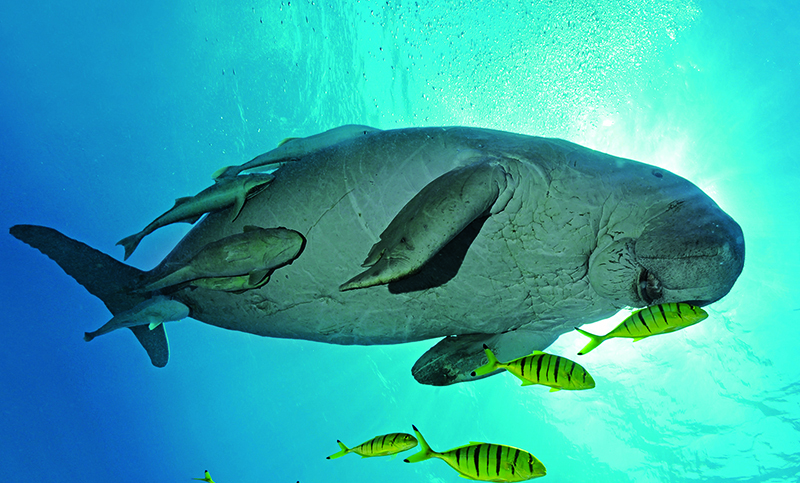
Dugong

== Artiodactyla ==
- Chital, Axis axis
- Blue whale, Balaenoptera musculus
- Domestic water buffalo, Bubalus bubalis
- Short-beaked saddle-backed dolphin, Delphinus delphis
- Dugong, Dugong dugon
- Asian elephant, Elephas maximus
- Northern red muntjac, Muntiacus vaginalis
- Melon-headed whale, Peponocephala electra
- Sperm whale, Physeter catodon
- False killer whale, Pseudorca crassidens
- Indo-Pacific humpback dolphin, Sousa chinensis
- Spinner dolphin, Stenella longirostris
- Wild boar, Sus scrofa
- Indo-Pacific bottlenose dolphin, Tursiops aduncus

== Carnivora ==
- Domestic dog, Canis familiaris
- Domestic cat, Felis catus
- Masked palm civet, Paguma larvata

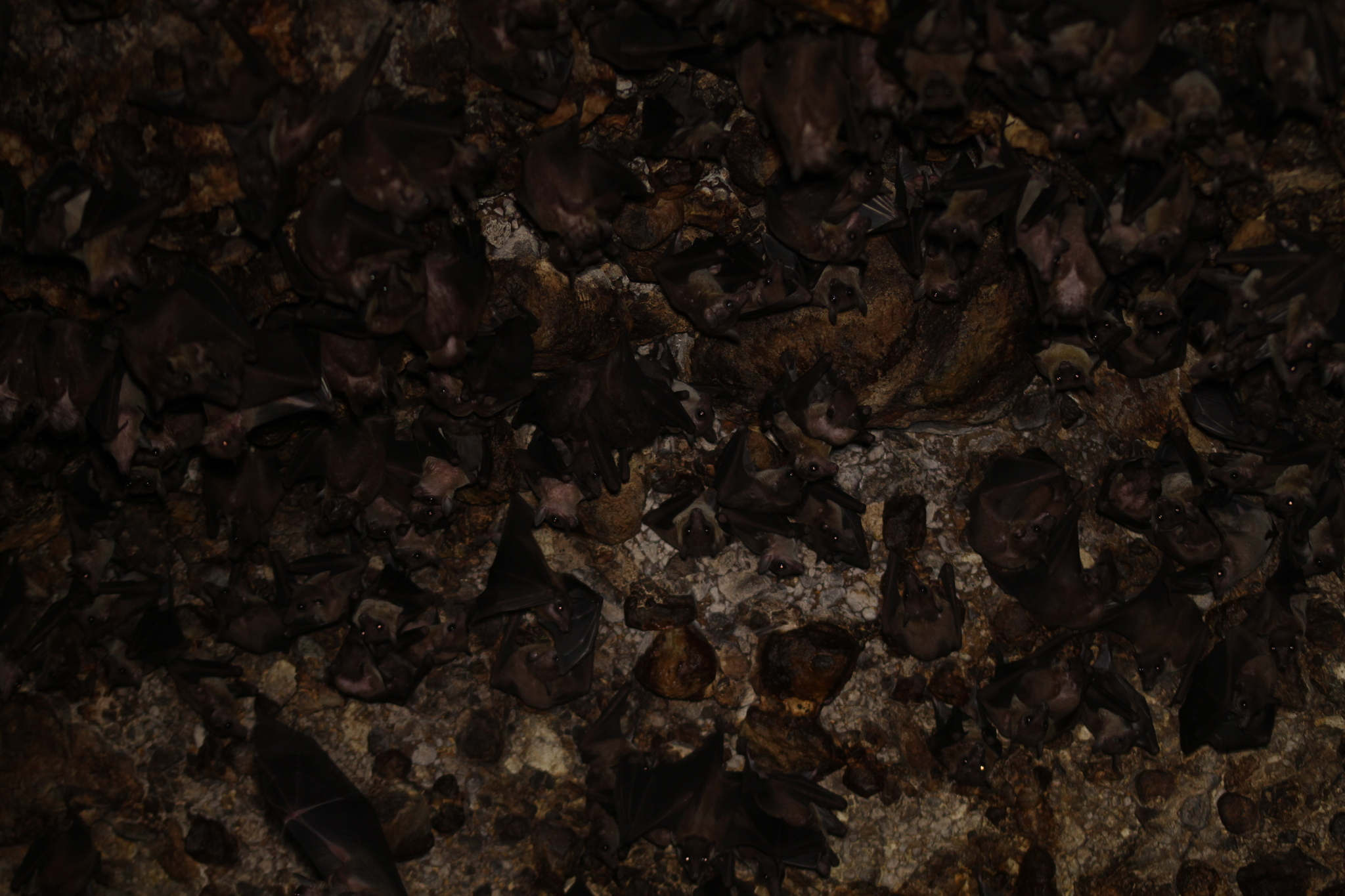
Cave nectar bat

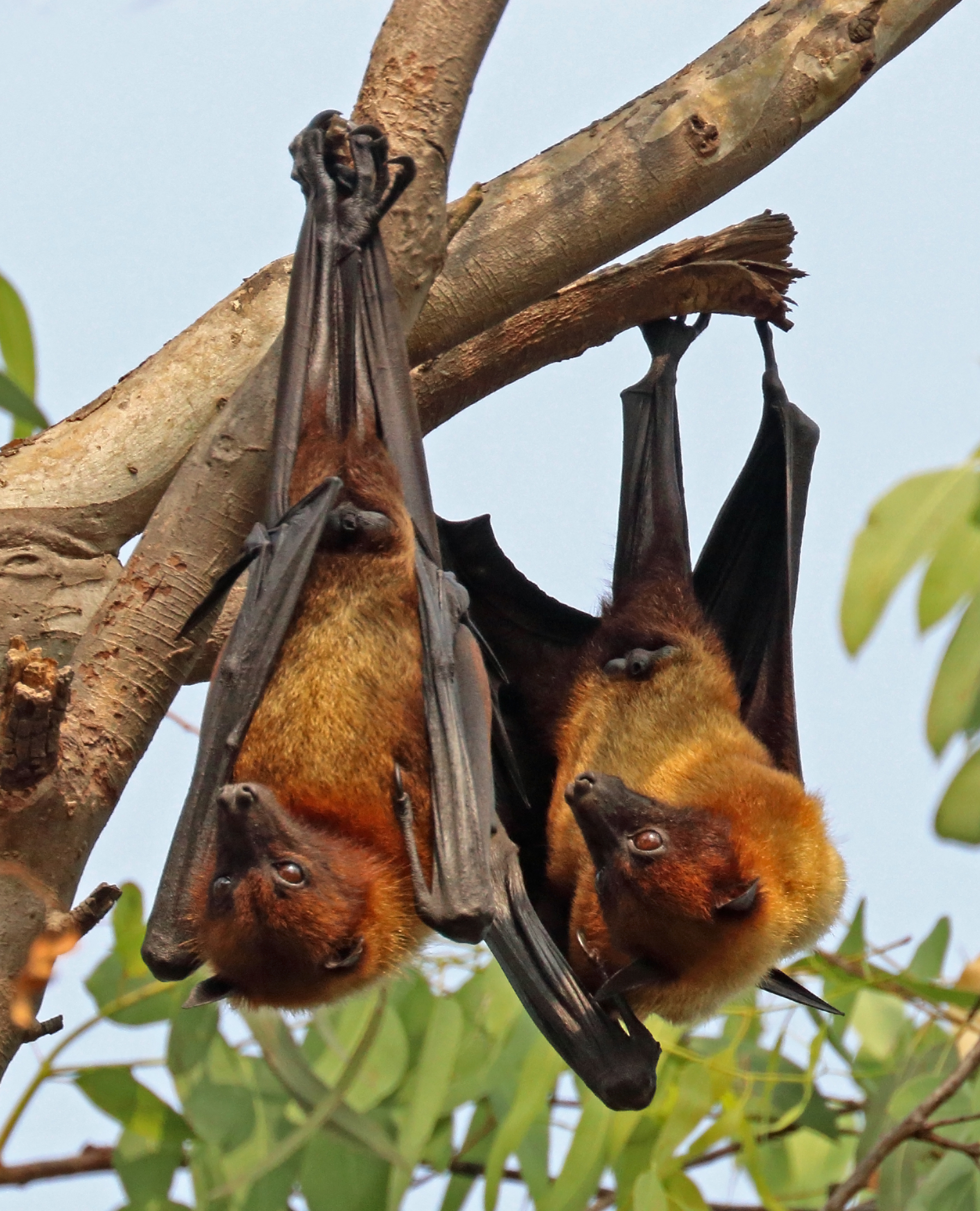
Indian flying fox

== Chiroptera ==
- Lesser short-nosed fruit bat, Cynopterus brachyotis
- Greater short-nosed fruit bat, Cynopterus sphinx
- Cave nectar bat, Eonycteris spelaea
- Tickell's bat, Hesperoptenus tickelli
- Diadem leaf-nosed bat, Hipposideros diadema
- Fulvus roundleaf bat, Hipposideros fulvus
- Intermediate roundleaf bat, Hipposideros larvatus
- Nicobar leaf-nosed bat, Hipposideros nicobarulae
- Pomona roundleaf bat, Hipposideros pomona
- Lesser false vampire bat, Megaderma spasma
- Small bent-winged bat, Miniopterus pusillus
- Horsfield's bat, Myotis horsfieldii
- Indian pipistrelle, Pipistrellus coromandra
- Java pipistrelle, Pipistrellus javanicus
- Nicobar flying fox, Pteropus faunulus
- Indian flying fox, Pteropus giganteus
- Island flying fox, Pteropus hypomelanus
- Black-eared flying fox, Pteropus melanotus
- Large flying fox, Pteropus vampyrus
- Intermediate horseshoe bat, Rhinolophus affinis
- Andaman horseshoe bat, Rhinolophus cognatus
- Dobson's horseshoe bat, Rhinolophus yunanensis
- Lesser mouse-tailed bat, Rhinopoma hardwickii
- Lesser Asiatic yellow bat, Scotophilus kuhlii
- Black-bearded tomb bat, Taphozous melanopogon
- Naked-rumped pouched bat, Taphozous saccolaimus
- Lesser bamboo bat, Tylonycteris pachypus

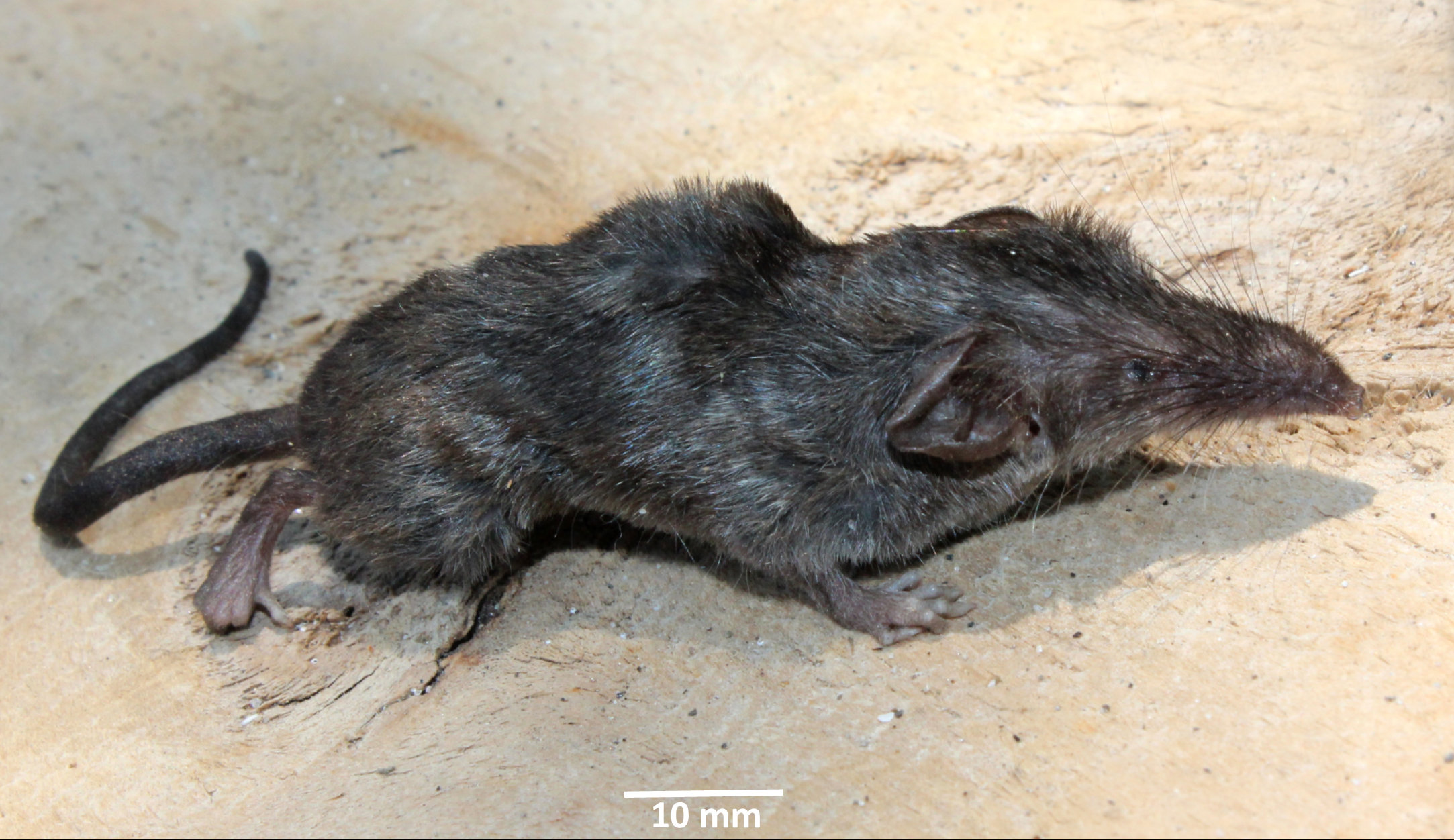
Narcondam shrew

== Eulipotyphla ==
- Andaman white-toothed shrew, Crocidura andamanensis
- Andaman shrew, Crocidura hispida
- Jenkins's shrew, Crocidura jenkinsi
- Narcondam shrew, Crocidura narcondami
- Nicobar shrew, Crocidura nicobarica
- Nicobar treeshrew, Tupaia nicobarica

== Primates ==
- Crab-eating macaque, Macaca fascicularis

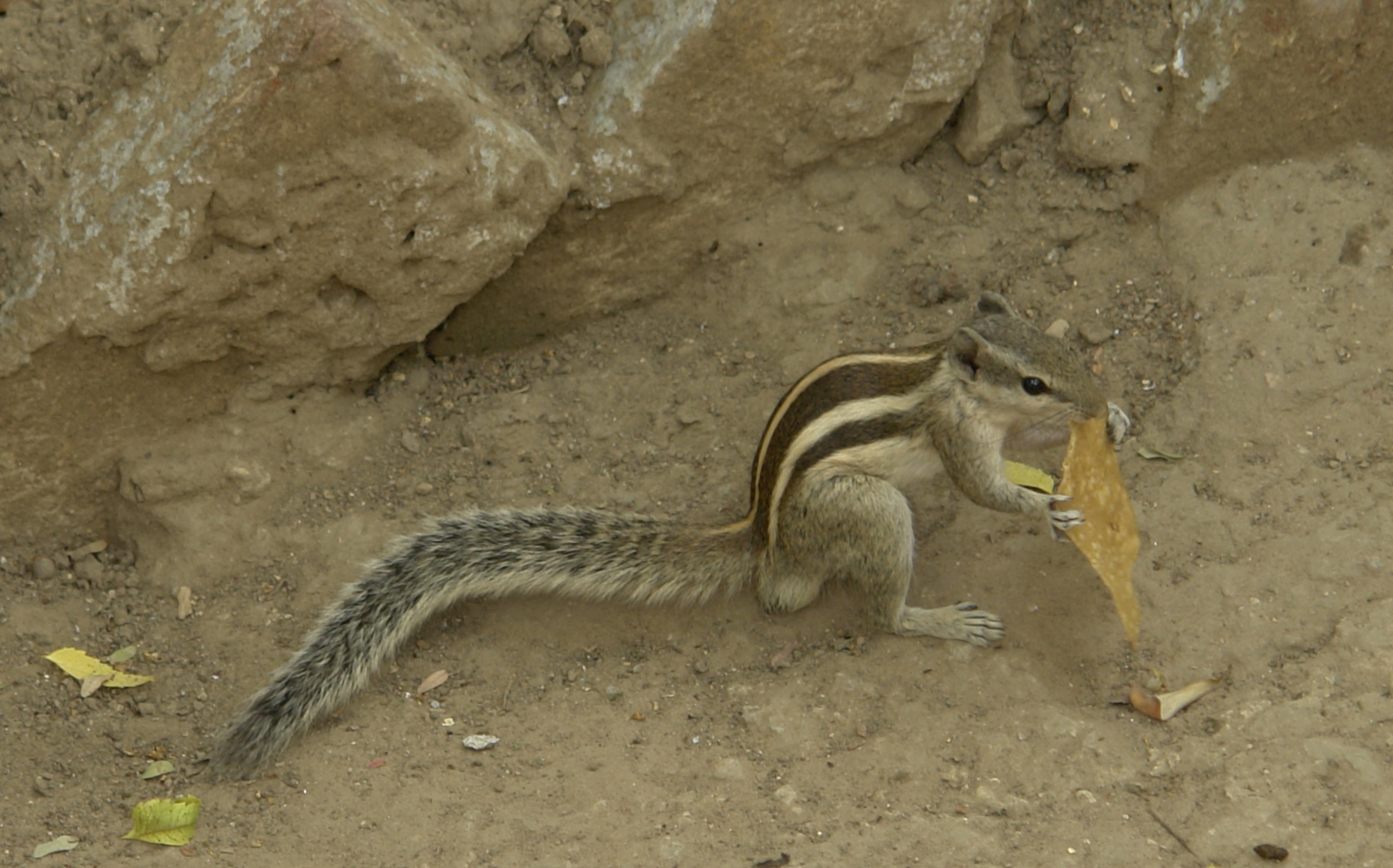
Northern palm squirrel

== Rodentia ==
- Northern palm squirrel, Funambulus pennantii
- Fawn-colored mouse, Mus cervicolor
- House mouse, Mus musculus
- Sikkim rat, Rattus andamanensis
- Nonsense rat, Rattus burrus
- Palm rat, Rattus palmarum
- Black rat, Rattus rattus
- Andaman rat, Rattus stoicus
- Tanezumi rat, Rattus tanezumi
