= Selangor woolly horseshoe bat =

Scientific classification
- Kingdom: Animalia
- Phylum: Chordata
- Class: Mammalia
- Order: Chiroptera
- Family: Rhinolophidae
- Genus: Rhinolophus
- Species: R. luctoides

Binomial name
- Rhinolophus luctoides Volleth, Loidl, Mayer, Yong, Müller & Heller, 2015

Species of bat

The Selangor woolly horseshoe bat or luctus-like horseshoe bat (Rhinolophus luctoides) is a bat species of the family Rhinolophidae endemic to Malaysia. Populations of this species were previously classified within the woolly horseshoe bat (R. luctus).
