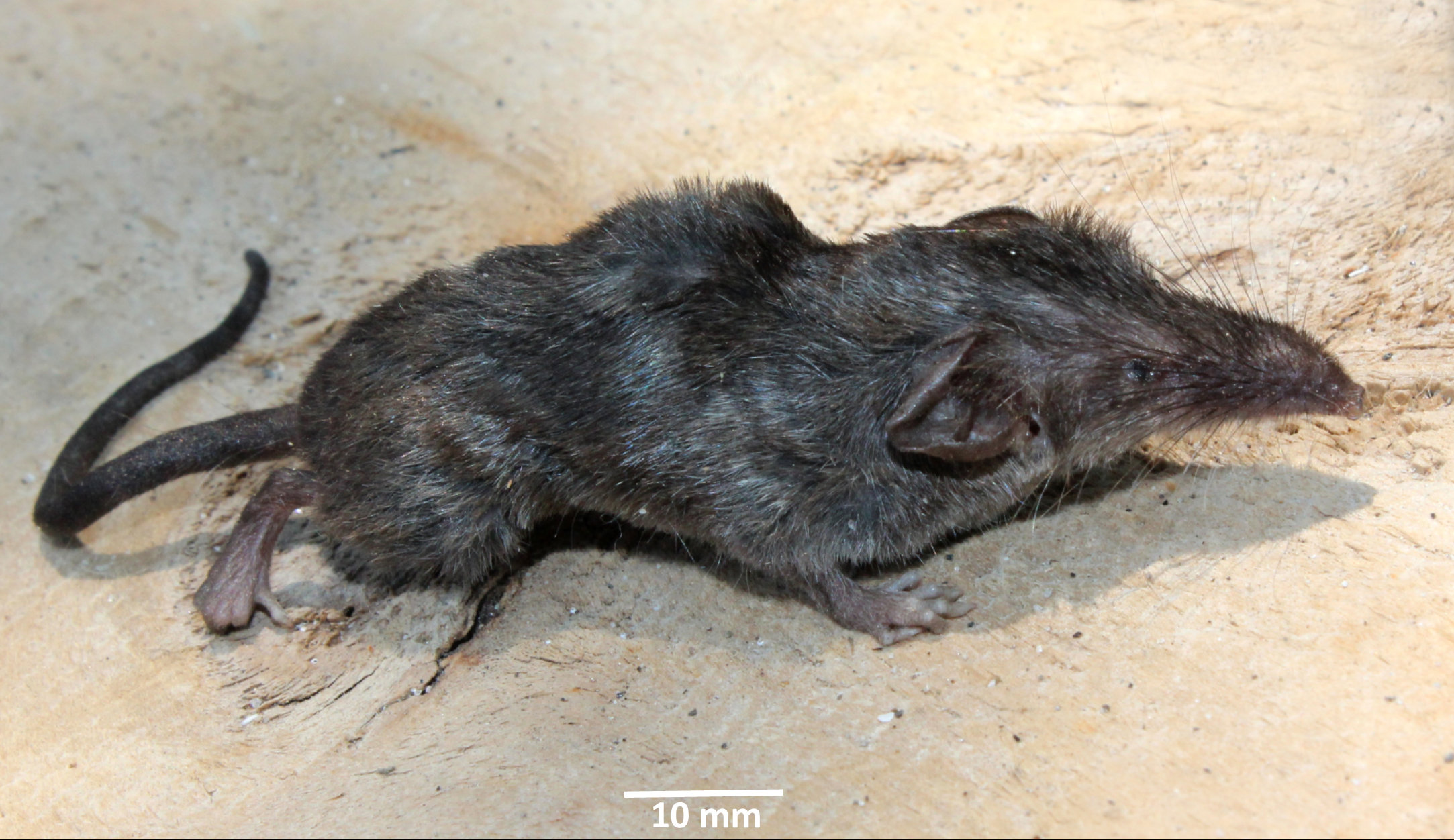

Scientific classification
- Kingdom: Animalia
- Phylum: Chordata
- Class: Mammalia
- Order: Eulipotyphla
- Family: Soricidae
- Genus: Crocidura
- Species: C. narcondamica

Binomial name
- Crocidura narcondamica Kamalakannan et al., 2021

= Narcondam shrew =

Species of shrew

The Narcondam shrew (Crocidura narcondamica) is a white-toothed shrew in the family Soricidae. It is endemic to Narcondam Island, a small, remote, volcanic island situated in Andaman Sea and considered part of the Andaman and Nicobar archipelago. It was discovered in April 2020 and was described about a year later in 2021.

The species lives in the sub-leaf stratum of the forest floor and primarily feeds on insects. The specific epithet is derived from the type locality, Narcondam Island. It is one of two endemic fauna of the island, the other being the Narcondam hornbill (Rhyticeros narcondami). The species displays significant genetic divergence from mainland Asian species such as the Chinese white-toothed shrew (Crocidura rapax), and even greater divergence from other endemic Crocidura species from the Andaman-Nicobar islands, such as the Andaman shrew (Crocidura andamanensis) and Nicobar shrew (Crocidura nicobarica); this indicates that C. narcondamica and the other endemic shrews of the Andamans and Nicobars are likely not the results of a single adaptive radiation as they initially appear, but rather represent at least three independent colonization events from the Asian mainland.

== See also ==
- List of living mammal species described in the 2020s
