= Rhinolophus huananus =

Conservation status
- Least Concern (IUCN 3.1)

Scientific classification
- Kingdom: Animalia
- Phylum: Chordata
- Class: Mammalia
- Order: Chiroptera
- Family: Rhinolophidae
- Genus: Rhinolophus
- Species: R. huananus

Binomial name
- Rhinolophus huananus Wu, Harada & Motokawa, 2008

Species of bat

Rhinolophus huananus is a species of horseshoe bat endemic to southern China.
