= Halcyon horseshoe bat =

Conservation status
- Least Concern (IUCN 3.1)

Scientific classification
- Kingdom: Animalia
- Phylum: Chordata
- Class: Mammalia
- Order: Chiroptera
- Family: Rhinolophidae
- Genus: Rhinolophus
- Species: R. alcyone

Binomial name
- Rhinolophus alcyone Temminck, 1852
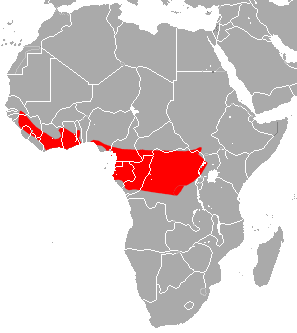
- Halcyon Horseshoe Bat range

Species of bat

The halcyon horseshoe bat (Rhinolophus alcyone) is a species of bat in the family Rhinolophidae. It is found in Cameroon, Republic of the Congo, Democratic Republic of the Congo, Ivory Coast, Equatorial Guinea, Ghana, Guinea, Kenya, Liberia, Nigeria, Senegal, South Sudan, Togo, Uganda, possibly Gabon, and possibly Sierra Leone. Its natural habitats are subtropical and tropical dry and moist lowland forest, moist savanna, caves, and other subterranean habitats.

== Taxonomy ==
The halcyon horseshoe bat was described as a new species in 1852 by Dutch zoologist Coenraad Jacob Temminck. The holotype had been collected by Dutch zoologist Hendrik Pel. The type locality was given as Boutry river, Ghana. As the genus Rhinolophus is very speciose, it has been divided into species groups. The halcyon horseshoe bat is part of the R. landeri species group.

== Description ==
Individuals have a forearm length of 48–56 mm (1.9–2.2 in) and weigh 14–23 g (0.49–0.81 oz). It is considered medium-sized for an African horseshoe bat. The fur of its back is dark or medium brown, while its belly fur is paler. Alternately, some individuals have pale brown to orangeish-red fur. The dramatic color differences correspond to eastern and western populations of the species, which may lead to a reevaluation of their taxonomic statuses.

== Biology and ecology ==
Its diet and reproductive patterns are unknown, but four pregnant females were documented in February in Ivory Coast. While roosting it may be solitary or in small groups. It is affected by fly parasites Phthiridium inopinatum, a nycteribiid, and Raymondia allisoni, a streblid.

== Range and habitat ==
The halcyon horseshoe bat is distributed widely throughout Central and Western Africa. It is Sub-Saharan, with the southernmost extent of its range in Democratic Republic of the Congo. Though there is a record of it from Gabon, it is possible that this is a mistaken identification of a forest horseshoe bat. Its habitat includes forests and savannas. During the day, it roosts in sheltered places like caves, hollow logs, mines, or rarely, huts.
