= Thai horseshoe bat =

Conservation status
- Least Concern (IUCN 3.1)

Scientific classification
- Kingdom: Animalia
- Phylum: Chordata
- Class: Mammalia
- Order: Chiroptera
- Family: Rhinolophidae
- Genus: Rhinolophus
- Species: R. siamensis

Binomial name
- Rhinolophus siamensis Gyldenstolpe, 1917
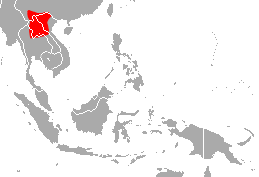
- 2011 range

Species of bat

The Thai horseshoe bat (Rhinolophus siamensis), sometimes called the Thai leaf-nosed bat, is a species of bat from the family Rhinolophidae. It is frequently listed as a subspecies of the Big-eared horseshoe bat, but this may be a result of the two species being taken in sympatry in Laos. It is native to China, Laos, Thailand, and Vietnam.

The species is listed as Least Concern on the IUCN Red List. Little is known about the Thai horseshoe bat, including its abundance, population size, population trend, major threats, natural history, or presence in protected areas. It is assumed that the Thai horseshoe bat is associated with limestone caves in evergreen forests like other species in its genus.

== See also ==
- Big-eared horseshoe bat
- Horseshoe bats
