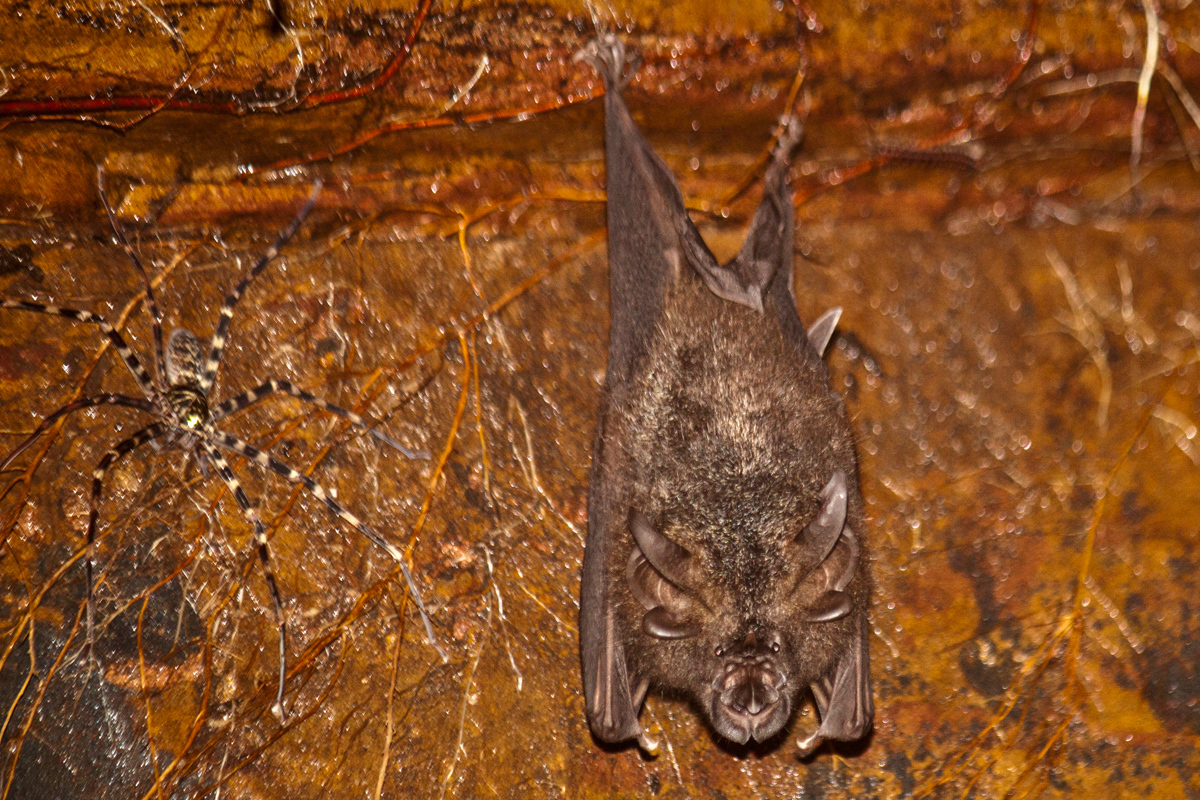

Conservation status
- Least Concern (IUCN 3.1)

Scientific classification
- Kingdom: Animalia
- Phylum: Chordata
- Class: Mammalia
- Order: Chiroptera
- Family: Rhinolophidae
- Genus: Rhinolophus
- Species: R. luctus

Binomial name
- Rhinolophus luctus Temminck, 1835
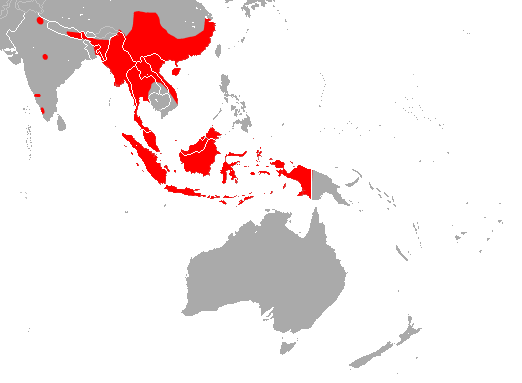
- Woolly horseshoe bat range (includes species previously classified in luctus)

= Great woolly horseshoe bat =

Species of bat

The great woolly horseshoe bat (Rhinolophus luctus) is a species of bat in the family Rhinolophidae.

It is endemic to Southeast Asia. The northern woolly horseshoe bat (R. perniger), Malaysian woolly horseshoe bat (R. morio), and Andersen's woolly horseshoe bat (R. foetidus) were previously classified in this species but have since been reclassified as their own species, and other populations have been described as distinct species of their own: the Selangor woolly horseshoe bat (R. luctoides).
