= Marshall's horseshoe bat =

Conservation status
- Least Concern (IUCN 3.1)

Scientific classification
- Kingdom: Animalia
- Phylum: Chordata
- Class: Mammalia
- Order: Chiroptera
- Family: Rhinolophidae
- Genus: Rhinolophus
- Species: R. marshalli

Binomial name
- Rhinolophus marshalli Thonglongya, 1973
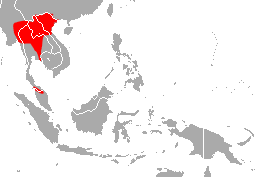
- Marshall's horseshoe bat range

Species of bat

Marshall's horseshoe bat (Rhinolophus marshalli) is a species of bat in the family Rhinolophidae. It is found in Laos, Malaysia, Thailand, and Vietnam.
