= Shortridge's horseshoe bat =

Conservation status
- Data Deficient (IUCN 3.1)

Scientific classification
- Kingdom: Animalia
- Phylum: Chordata
- Class: Mammalia
- Infraclass: Placentalia
- Order: Chiroptera
- Family: Rhinolophidae
- Genus: Rhinolophus
- Species: R. shortridgei

Binomial name
- Rhinolophus shortridgei K. Andersen, 1918
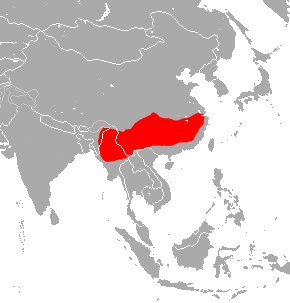
- Shortridge's horseshoe bat range

Species of bat

Shortridge's horseshoe bat (Rhinolophus shortridgei) is a species of Horseshoe bat native to Northeast India, northern Myanmar, and southern China. It was first described in 1918 by Knud Andersen, and was considered a subspecies of Blyth's horseshoe bat until 2003 when the two species were collected in sympatry.

== Description ==
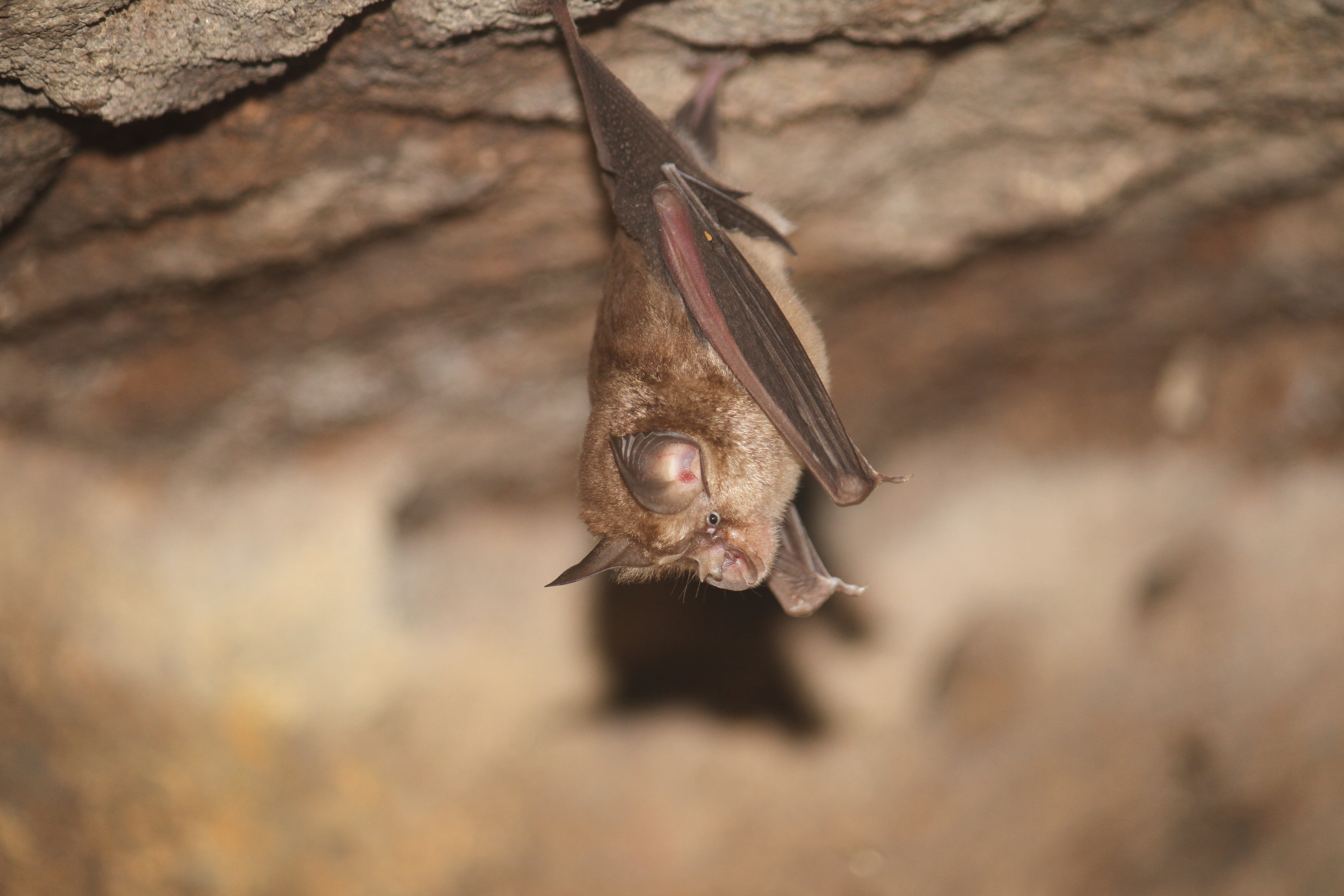
Rhinolophus lepidus, the Blyth's horseshoe bat, of which the Shortridge's horseshoe bat is closet morphologically.

It is of medium size with a long mandible and a nose leaf which does not completely cover its nostril. It has brown fur with a relatively pale underside.

== Range and conservation status ==
In China, the species is found in Yunnan, Sichuan, Guizhou, Hunan, Guangxi, Hubei, Hainan, Guangdong and Fujian provinces. It is also found in northern parts of India and in Myanmar. There is limited data on the habitat of R. shortridgei but specimens have been collected from a dipterocarp forest in Burma. Despite the lack of population data, IUCN has listed it as data deficient.
