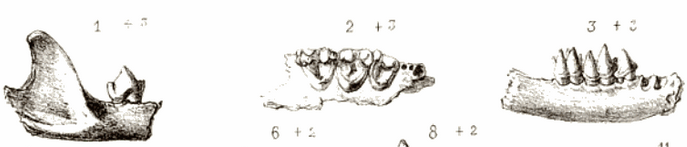
- Upper and lower maxilla of Palaeonycteris robustus

Scientific classification
- Domain: Eukaryota
- Kingdom: Animalia
- Phylum: Chordata
- Class: Mammalia
- Order: Chiroptera
- Family: Rhinolophidae
- Genus: †Palaeonycteris; Pomel, 1853

= Palaeonycteris =

Extinct genus of bats

Palaeonycteris is an extinct genus of the horseshoe bat family. It is the only genus in the family besides Rhinolophus and the also extinct Protorhinolophus. It is known from the Oligocene of Europe. The type species of the genus is Palaeonycteris robustus.

Several species have been assigned to this genus:

- Palaeonycteris insignis von Meyer, 1845
- Palaeonycteris praecox von Meyer, 1845
- Palaeonycteris robustus Pomel, 1853
