= Malaysian woolly horseshoe bat =

Scientific classification
- Domain: Eukaryota
- Kingdom: Animalia
- Phylum: Chordata
- Class: Mammalia
- Order: Chiroptera
- Family: Rhinolophidae
- Genus: Rhinolophus
- Species: R. morio

Binomial name
- Rhinolophus morio Gray, 1842

Species of bat

The Malaysian woolly horseshoe bat or Jester's horseshoe bat (Rhinolophus morio) is a bat species of the family Rhinolophidae. It is found in the Malay Peninsula and northern Sumatra.
