= Swinny's horseshoe bat =

Conservation status
- Least Concern (IUCN 3.1)

Scientific classification
- Kingdom: Animalia
- Phylum: Chordata
- Class: Mammalia
- Infraclass: Placentalia
- Order: Chiroptera
- Family: Rhinolophidae
- Genus: Rhinolophus
- Species: R. swinnyi

Binomial name
- Rhinolophus swinnyi Gough, 1908
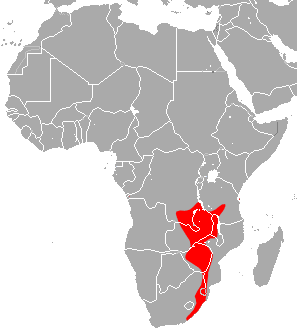
- Swinny's horseshoe bat range

Species of bat

Swinny's horseshoe bat (Rhinolophus swinnyi) is a species of bat in the family Rhinolophidae. In English, R. swinnyi is commonly referred to as Swinny's horseshoe bat. In Afrikaans, it is commonly referred to as Swinny se saalneusvlermuis. This species belongs to the African clade. R. swinnyi was discovered by an African collector H. H. Swinny. They have been recorded in Angola, Republic of the Congo, Mozambique, South Africa, Tanzania, Zambia, Zimbabwe, and Malawi.

== Taxonomy ==
R. swinnyi is in the same family as R. denti and R. simulator. These species have very similar body structure, size, morphology and echolocation calls. This led scientists to the conclusion that R. swinny was a subspecies of R. denti and R. simulator. Genetic studies have shown that R. swinnyi is a separate, distinct species.

== Distribution ==
R. swinnyi is endemic to Africa. They have an extensive geographic distribution across the African continent. The surface area of their wings is comparatively larger resulting in decreased wing loading. This leads to limited dispersal and restricted range between populations. The bats live in small groups of 10 with less than 1,000 mature species in each colony. The total population is predicted to be around 10,000.

== Biology ==
=== Description ===
R. swinnyi are a species of small bats with an average total length of 70 mm and an average weight of 7.6 g. The most distinguishing characteristic of this family is their nasal region. This region has three parts, the lancet, the sella, and the nose leaf. The nose-leaf is in the shape of a horseshoe and varies in size and shape. The backside of their body is grey to brown and white at the bottom. The frontside is significantly lighter, pale brown to off-white. They have short pointy ears, light brown to light grey wings and interfemoral membrane. Their skull is a total length of 17.5 mm. The posterior premolar teeth are long located between the canines. Their flight patterns are slow with high maneuverability. They have lower wing loading which increases their ability to lift and move quickly and easily.

=== Habitat and behaviour ===
Swinny's horseshoe bats are largely found in montane forest and savanna woodlands. They roost in wet, sheltered caves and have no preference for particular vegetation. Like most nocturnal bats, R. swinnyi reside in dark areas of caves and old mining sites. They roost during broad daylight hanging from the ceiling, individually or in pairs dispersed throughout their sheltered area. Some species have been found in company with similar species such as R. simulator. They use echolocation to navigate, forage for food in the dark and in mate choice. They have an average echolocation frequency of 106.7 kHz.

Many of their reproductive and chronology patterns are not known yet.

=== Diet ===
Swinny's horseshoe bats are an insectivorous species. Whitaker and Black studied the stomach contents of bats from the family Rhinolophidae and discovered that R. swinnyi fed almost exclusively on mature Lepidoptera. Other insects they feed on include termites, beetles, flies, and crickets.

== Threats and conservation ==
Swinny's horseshoe bats are threatened by agriculture, extraction of timber, firewood, degradation of forest habitats, and human settlement. The IUCN Red List categorizes the status of Rhinolophus swinnyi as least concern, meaning the current population trend is stable and there is no risk of the species going extinct.
