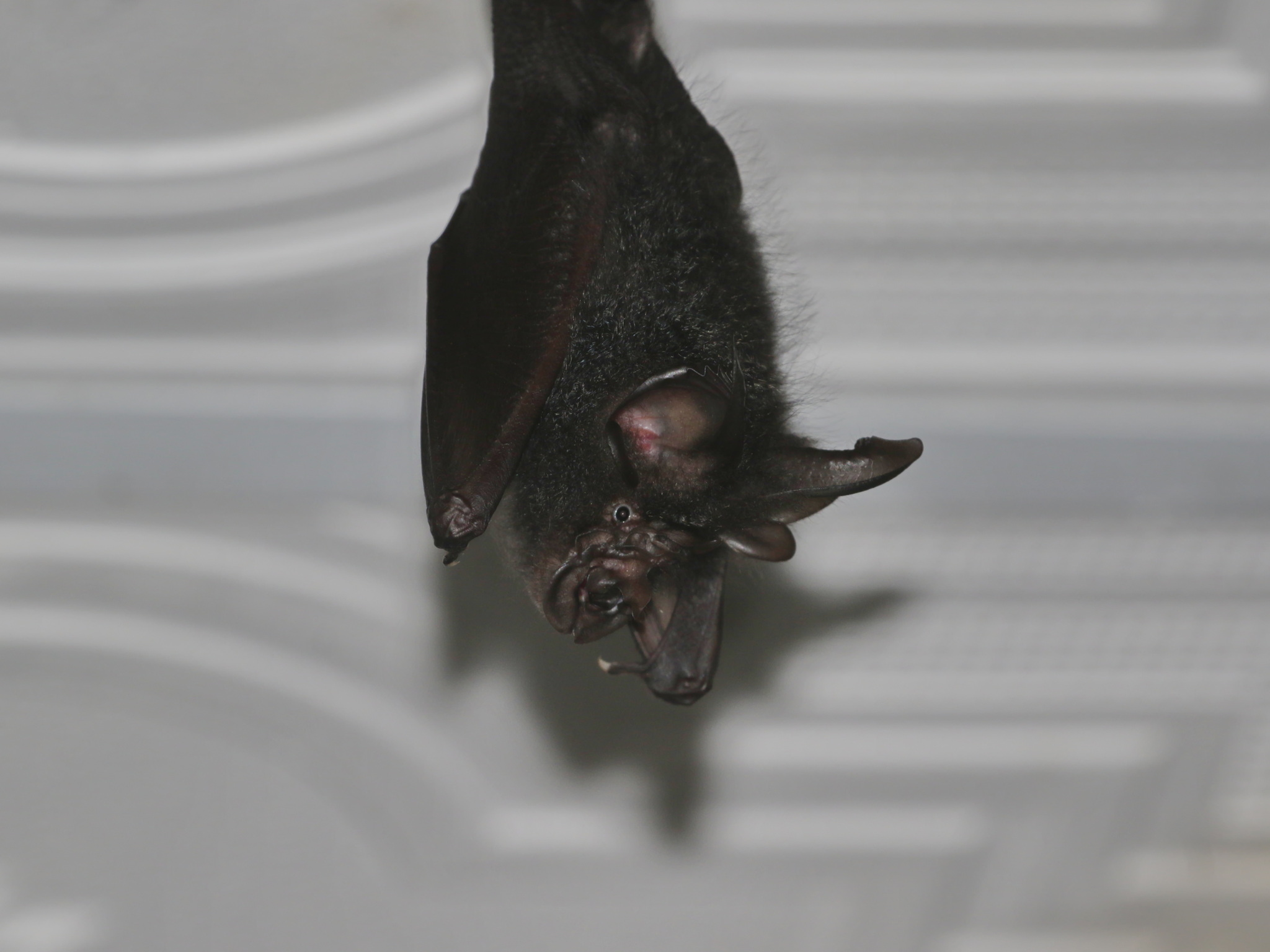

Scientific classification
- Kingdom: Animalia
- Phylum: Chordata
- Class: Mammalia
- Order: Chiroptera
- Family: Rhinolophidae
- Genus: Rhinolophus
- Species: R. perniger

Binomial name
- Rhinolophus perniger Hodgson, 1843

Synonyms
- Rhinolophus lanosus K. Andersen, 1905

= Northern woolly horseshoe bat =

Species of bat

The northern woolly horseshoe bat (Rhinolophus perniger) is a bat species of the family Rhinolophidae. It is found in the Indian Subcontinent, Southeast Asia, and China.
