= Rhinolophus sedulus =

Conservation status
- Near Threatened (IUCN 3.1)

Scientific classification
- Kingdom: Animalia
- Phylum: Chordata
- Class: Mammalia
- Order: Chiroptera
- Family: Rhinolophidae
- Genus: Rhinolophus
- Species: R. sedulus

Binomial name
- Rhinolophus sedulus K. Andersen, 1905
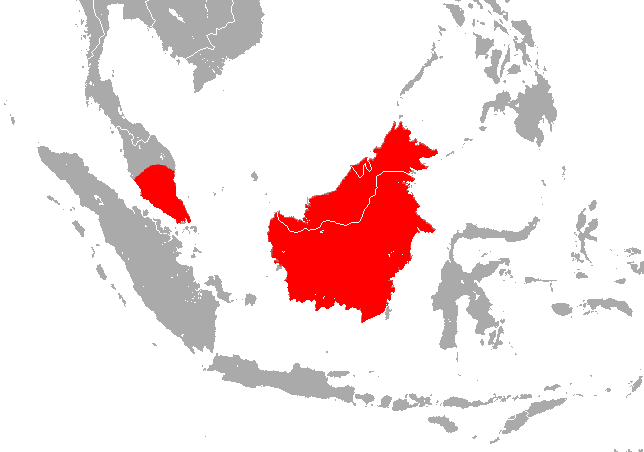
- Rhinolophus sedulus range

Species of bat

The lesser woolly horseshoe bat (Rhinolophus sedulus) is a species of bat in the family Rhinolophidae. It is found in Brunei, Indonesia, and Malaysia. It is assessed as near-threatened by the IUCN.

== Taxonomy ==
The bat was first described by biologist Knud Anderson in 1905. It belongs to the trifoliatus species group.

== Description ==
The bat is relatively small, with long, woolly, blackish fur. It has a dark and complicated noseleaf with pointed lancet located between the eyes, and a pair of lappets on either side of the sella. It also has large and forward pointing ears.

The bat weighs up to 11 g (0.39 oz) and has a forearm length of 38–48 mm (1.5–1.9 in).

== Biology ==
The species is suspected to be monogamous.

== Habitat and distribution ==
The species is found across Peninsular Malaysia and Borneo, and also suspected to inhabit Singapore, mostly in lowland primary forest. It roosts singly or in pairs in caves, hollows formed by trees, and also man-made places like culverts.

== Conservation ==
The bat is assessed as near-threatened. The main threats to the bat are rapid habitat loss caused by logging, agricultural development, plantations and forest fires, which affects foraging as well as roosting habitat.
