= Large rufous horseshoe bat =

Conservation status
- Near Threatened (IUCN 3.1)

Scientific classification
- Kingdom: Animalia
- Phylum: Chordata
- Class: Mammalia
- Order: Chiroptera
- Family: Rhinolophidae
- Genus: Rhinolophus
- Species: R. rufus

Binomial name
- Rhinolophus rufus Eydoux & Gervais, 1836
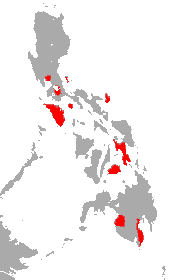
- Large rufous horseshoe bat range

Species of bat

The large rufous horseshoe bat (Rhinolophus rufus) is a species of bat in the family Rhinolophidae. It is endemic to the Philippines.
