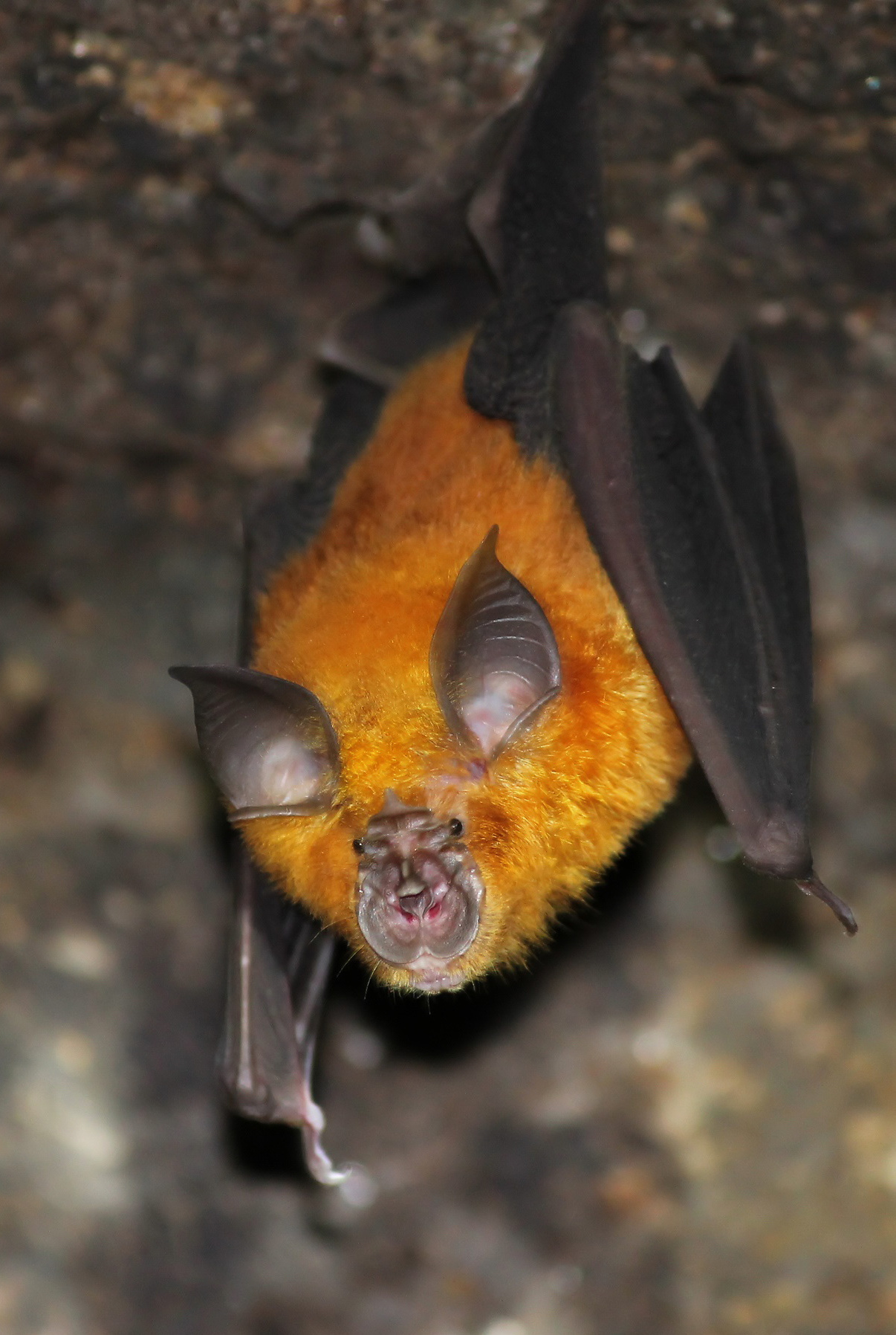
- Male in breeding season

Conservation status
- Least Concern (IUCN 3.1)

Scientific classification
- Kingdom: Animalia
- Phylum: Chordata
- Class: Mammalia
- Order: Chiroptera
- Family: Rhinolophidae
- Genus: Rhinolophus
- Species: R. rouxii

Binomial name
- Rhinolophus rouxii Temminck, 1835
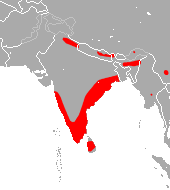
- Rufous horseshoe bat range

= Rufous horseshoe bat =

Species of bat

The rufous horseshoe bat (Rhinolophus rouxii) is a species of bat in the family Rhinolophidae. It is found in China, India, Myanmar, Nepal, Sri Lanka, and Vietnam.

It has been identified as a vector of severe acute respiratory syndrome coronavirus (SARS-CoV or SARS-CoV-1) that caused the 2002–2004 SARS outbreak.
