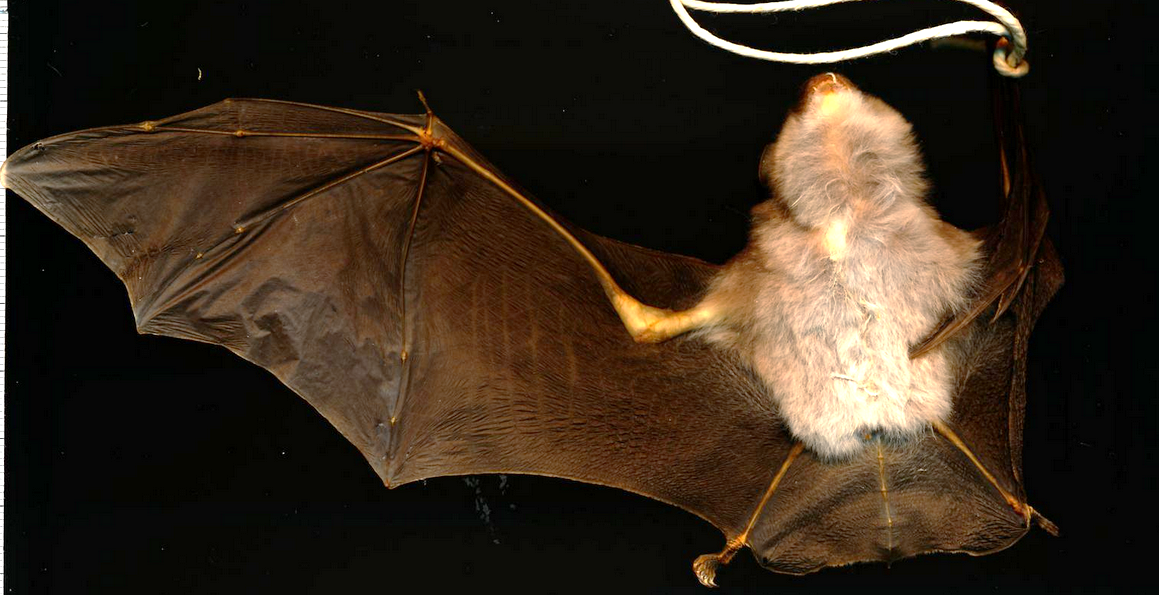

Conservation status
- Least Concern (IUCN 3.1)

Scientific classification
- Kingdom: Animalia
- Phylum: Chordata
- Class: Mammalia
- Order: Chiroptera
- Family: Rhinolophidae
- Genus: Rhinolophus
- Species: R. blasii

Binomial name
- Rhinolophus blasii Peters, 1866
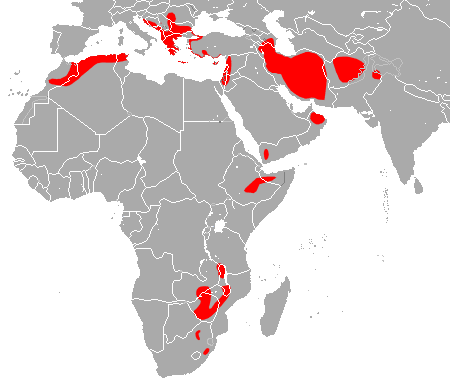
- Blasius's horseshoe bat range

= Blasius's horseshoe bat =

Species of bat

Blasius's horseshoe bat (Rhinolophus blasii) is a species of insectivorous bat in the family Rhinolophidae found throughout large parts of the Mediterranean, Middle East and Africa.

== Taxonomy ==
Blasius's horseshoe bat was described as a new species in 1866 by German naturalist Wilhelm Peters. The holotype had been collected in Italy. The eponym for the species name "blasii" was German zoologist Johann Heinrich Blasius.

== Description ==
Individuals have forearm lengths of 43–48 mm (1.7–1.9 in) and weigh 7–13 g (0.25–0.46 oz), making it small for an African horseshoe bat.

== Biology and ecology ==
Blasius's horseshoe bat is insectivorous, consuming moths, termites, beetles, and flies, among other kinds. It hunts for its prey by hawking, or catching insects on the wing, or gleaning, which means plucking insects off foliage or the ground. Its social behaviors are poorly understood, but it will roost singly or in small groups. Group foraging consisting of up to five individuals has been reported in Malawi. They have one annual breeding season, and females give birth to a single young.

Possible predators of Blasius's horseshoe bats include snakes, owls and sometimes other bats.

== Range and habitat ==
Blasius's horseshoe bat has been documented at a range of elevations from 0–2,215 m (0–7,267 ft) above sea level. It has a large geographic range, though its populations are patchily distributed. Its range includes Africa, Asia, and Europe. It is extinct in Italy, and possibly extinct in Slovenia. Its habitat includes deserts, savannas, shrublands, and forests.
