= Forest horseshoe bat =

Conservation status
- Data Deficient (IUCN 3.1)

Scientific classification
- Kingdom: Animalia
- Phylum: Chordata
- Class: Mammalia
- Order: Chiroptera
- Family: Rhinolophidae
- Genus: Rhinolophus
- Species: R. silvestris

Binomial name
- Rhinolophus silvestris Aellen, 1959
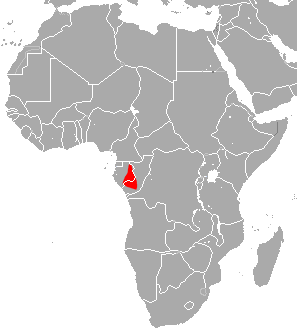
- Forest horseshoe bat range

Species of bat

The forest horseshoe bat (Rhinolophus silvestris) is a species of bat in the family Rhinolophidae. It is found in the Republic of the Congo and Gabon. Its natural habitats are subtropical or tropical moist lowland forest and caves.
