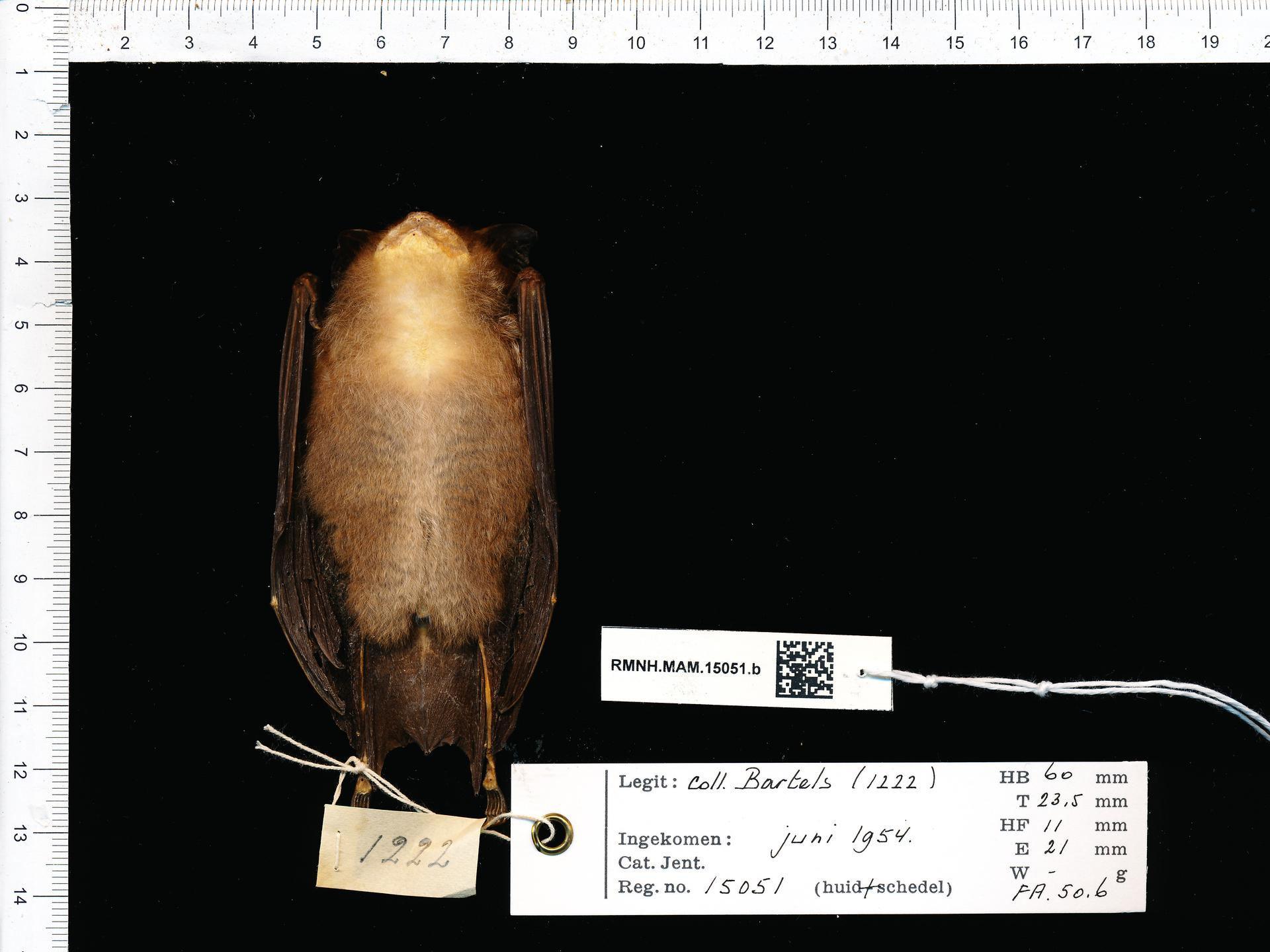

Conservation status
- Least Concern (IUCN 3.1)

Scientific classification
- Kingdom: Animalia
- Phylum: Chordata
- Class: Mammalia
- Order: Chiroptera
- Family: Rhinolophidae
- Genus: Rhinolophus
- Species: R. acuminatus

Binomial name
- Rhinolophus acuminatus Peters, 1871
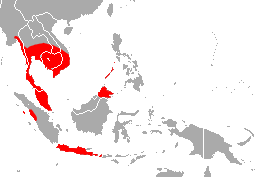
- Acuminate Horseshoe Bat range

= Acuminate horseshoe bat =

Acuminate Horseshoe Bat

Species of bat

The acuminate horseshoe bat (Rhinolophus acuminatus) is a species of bat in the family Rhinolophidae. It is found in Southeast Asia. It lives in forests and urban areas.

== Taxonomy and etymology ==
It was described as a new species in 1871 by German naturalist Wilhelm Peters. Its species name "acuminatus" is Latin for "pointed." The inspiration for this name was perhaps its "sharply upwards pointed sella."

== Description ==
Its forearm length is 48–50 mm (1.9–2.0 in); its tail length is 21–31 mm (0.83–1.22 in); its ear length is 20–21 mm (0.79–0.83 in). It weighs 11.5–13.5 g (0.41–0.48 oz).

== Biology and ecology ==
It is nocturnal, roosting in sheltered places during the day such as inside caves or on the undersides of palm leaves. It roosts in small colonies.

== Range and habitat ==
It is found in several countries in Southeast Asia, including Cambodia, Indonesia, Laos, Malaysia, Myanmar, Thailand, and Vietnam.

== Conservation ==
It is currently evaluated as least concern by the IUCN—its lowest conservation priority. Its range includes protected areas. It lacks major threats, although cave disturbance by humans is a local threat.
