= Dobson's horseshoe bat =

Conservation status
- Least Concern (IUCN 3.1)

Scientific classification
- Kingdom: Animalia
- Phylum: Chordata
- Class: Mammalia
- Order: Chiroptera
- Family: Rhinolophidae
- Genus: Rhinolophus
- Species: R. yunanensis

Binomial name
- Rhinolophus yunanensis Dobson, 1872
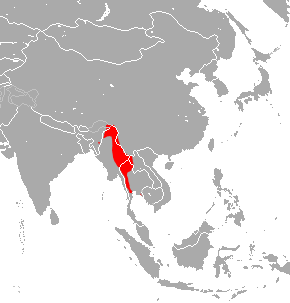
- Dobson's horseshoe bat range

Species of bat

Dobson's horseshoe bat (Rhinolophus yunanensis) is a species of bat in the family Rhinolophidae. It is found in China, India, Myanmar, and Thailand.
