= Osgood's horseshoe bat =

Conservation status
- Least Concern (IUCN 3.1)

Scientific classification
- Kingdom: Animalia
- Phylum: Chordata
- Class: Mammalia
- Order: Chiroptera
- Family: Rhinolophidae
- Genus: Rhinolophus
- Species: R. osgoodi

Binomial name
- Rhinolophus osgoodi Sanborn, 1939
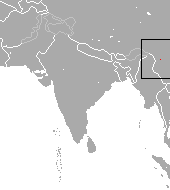
- Osgood's horseshoe bat range

Species of bat

Osgood's horseshoe bat (Rhinolophus osgoodi) is a species of bat in the family Rhinolophidae. It is endemic to China. Its name refers to Wilfred Hudson Osgood.
