= Little Nepalese horseshoe bat =

Conservation status
- Least Concern (IUCN 3.1)

Scientific classification
- Kingdom: Animalia
- Phylum: Chordata
- Class: Mammalia
- Order: Chiroptera
- Family: Rhinolophidae
- Genus: Rhinolophus
- Species: R. subbadius

Binomial name
- Rhinolophus subbadius Blyth, 1844
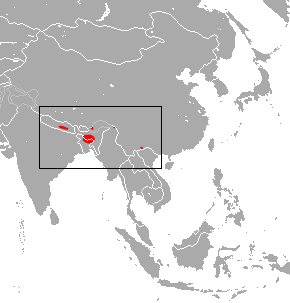
- Little Nepalese horseshoe bat range

Species of bat

The little Nepalese horseshoe bat (Rhinolophus subbadius) is a species of bat in the family Rhinolophidae. It is found in Bangladesh, China, India, Myanmar and Nepal, possibly in Bhutan.
