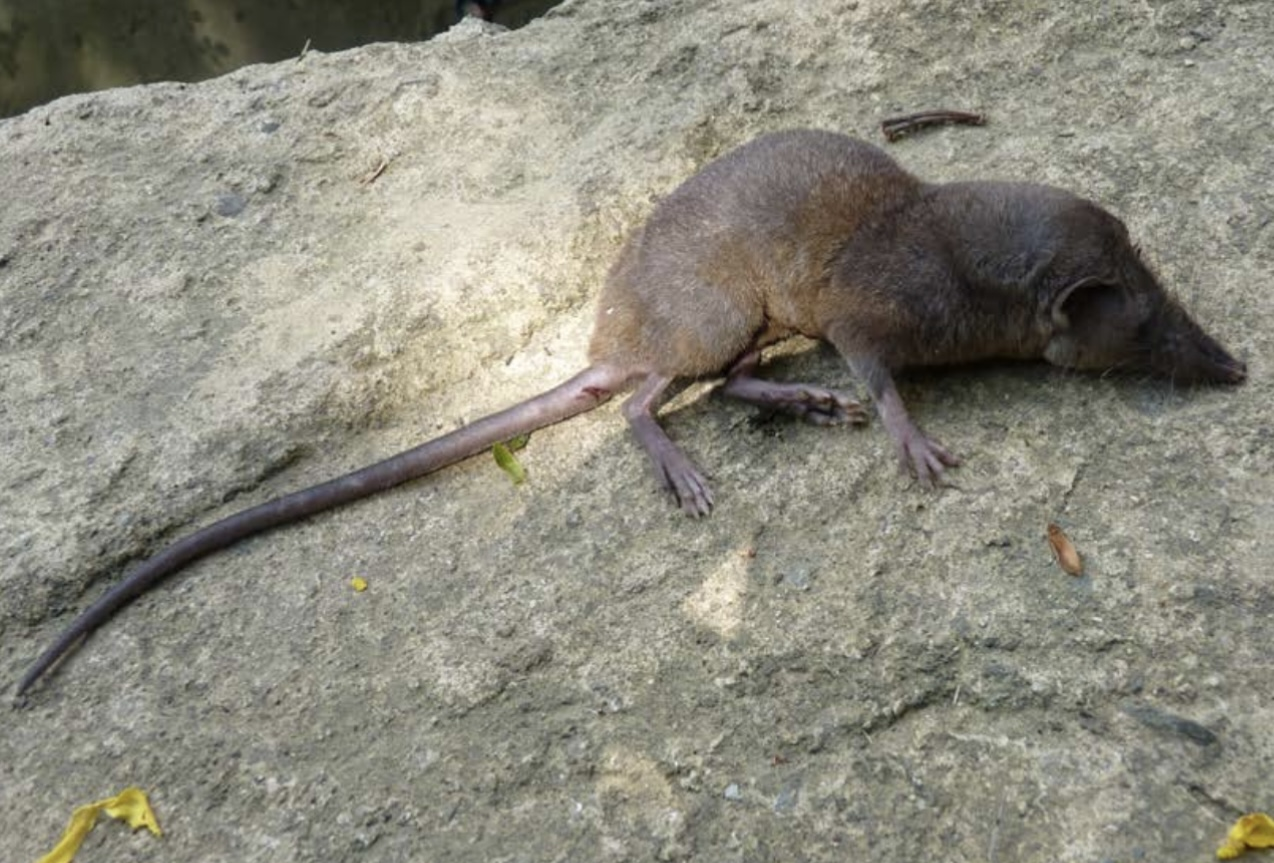

Conservation status
- Critically Endangered (IUCN 3.1)

Scientific classification
- Kingdom: Animalia
- Phylum: Chordata
- Class: Mammalia
- Order: Eulipotyphla
- Family: Soricidae
- Genus: Crocidura
- Species: C. nicobarica

Binomial name
- Crocidura nicobarica Miller, 1902
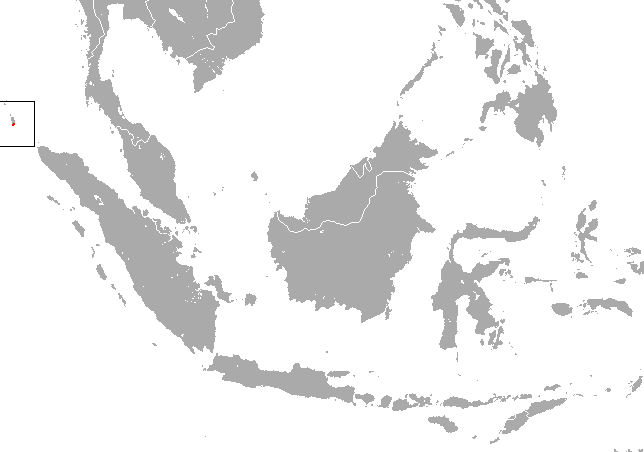
- Nicobar shrew range

Synonyms
- Nicobar white-tailed shrew

= Nicobar shrew =

Species of mammal

The Nicobar shrew or Nicobar white-tailed shrew (Crocidura nicobarica) is a critically endangered species of mammal in the family Soricidae. It is endemic to Great Nicobar Island in India.
