= Andaman shrew =

Conservation status
- Critically Endangered (IUCN 3.1)

Scientific classification
- Kingdom: Animalia
- Phylum: Chordata
- Class: Mammalia
- Order: Eulipotyphla
- Family: Soricidae
- Genus: Crocidura
- Species: C. andamanensis

Binomial name
- Crocidura andamanensis Miller, 1902
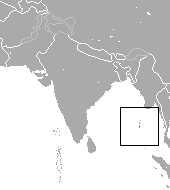
- Andaman shrew range

Species of mammal

The Andaman shrew or Andaman white-toothed shrew (Crocidura andamanensis) is a critically endangered species of mammal in the family Soricidae. It is endemic to South Andaman Island of India and is typically active during twilight or at night, requiring specialized habitat. Habitat loss due to selective logging and natural disasters, such as tsunamis and drastic weather changes, are thought to contribute to its current population decline.
