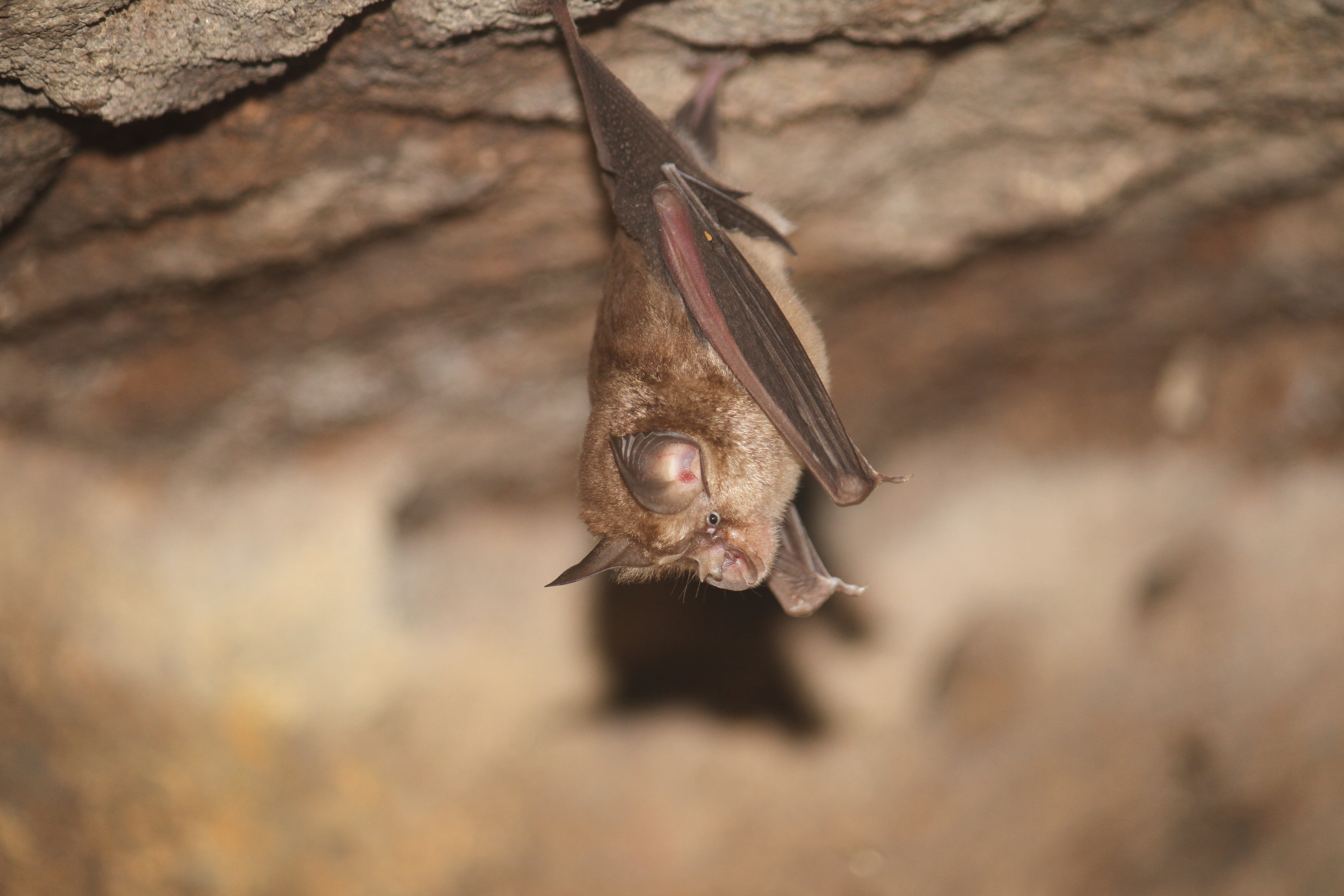

Conservation status
- Least Concern (IUCN 3.1)

Scientific classification
- Kingdom: Animalia
- Phylum: Chordata
- Class: Mammalia
- Order: Chiroptera
- Family: Rhinolophidae
- Genus: Rhinolophus
- Species: R. lepidus

Binomial name
- Rhinolophus lepidus Blyth, 1844
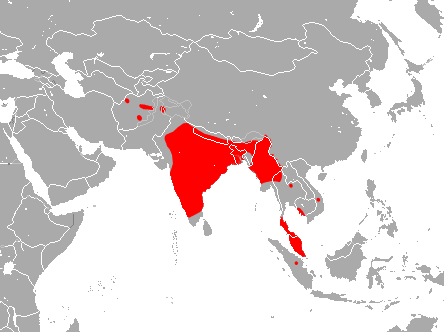
- Blyth's Horseshoe Bat range

= Blyth's horseshoe bat =

Species of bat

Blyth's horseshoe bat (Rhinolophus lepidus) is a species of bat in the family Rhinolophidae. It is found across southern Asia from Afghanistan to Vietnam. The species can be identified from its pointed, bifid sella.

== Taxonomy ==
Blyth's horseshoe bat was described as a new species in 1844 by English zoologist Edward Blyth. Blyth noted that the holotype had likely been collected near Kolkata, India.

== Description ==
Individuals have a forearm length of around 42 mm (1.7 in).

== Biology and ecology ==
The Blyth's horseshoe bat population on Tioman Island, Malaysia, is known to fly and hunt in the forest during the day and night. It is thought that these bats can forage during the day owing to the absence of resident avian predators in the forest there. It uses echolocation to navigate, flying in a fluttering style through cluttered airspace in search of insect prey. Its echolocation signal frequency is around 91 kHz.

== Range and habitat ==
Blyth's horseshoe bat is widely distributed in South and Southeast Asia, and has been documented in the following countries: Afghanistan, Bangladesh, Cambodia, China, India, Indonesia, Malaysia, Myanmar, Nepal, Pakistan, Thailand, and Vietnam. It is found at a range of elevations from 0–2,338 m (0–7,671 ft) above sea level.
