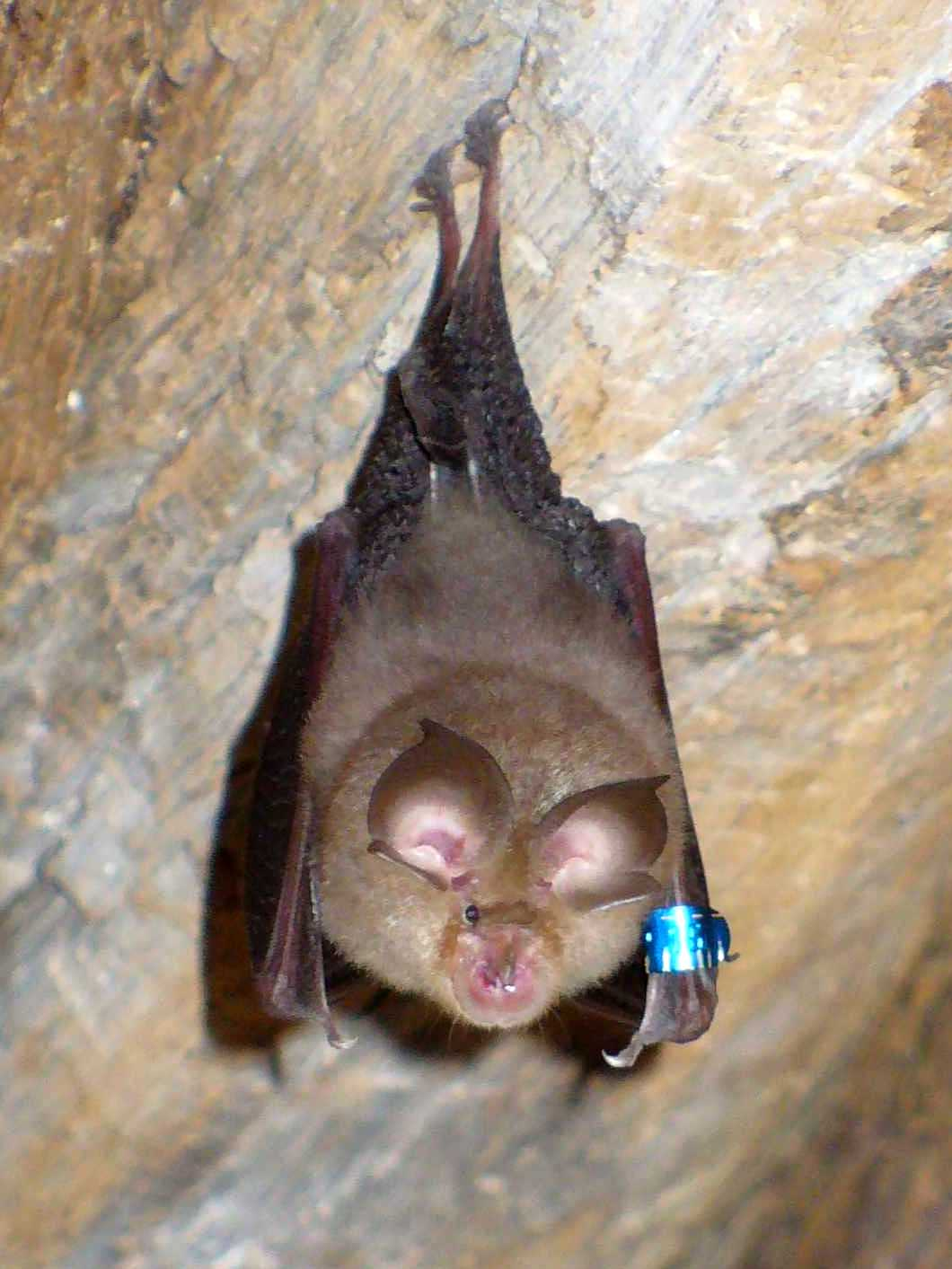
- Lesser horseshoe bat (Rhinolophus hipposideros) with blue metallic identification band on left wing

Scientific classification
- Kingdom: Animalia
- Phylum: Chordata
- Class: Mammalia
- Order: Chiroptera
- Family: Rhinolophidae; Gray, 1825
- Subfamily: Rhinolophinae; Gray, 1825
- Genus: Rhinolophus; Lacépède, 1799

Type species
- Vespertilio ferrum-equinum Schreber, 1774

Species
- List of rhinolophids
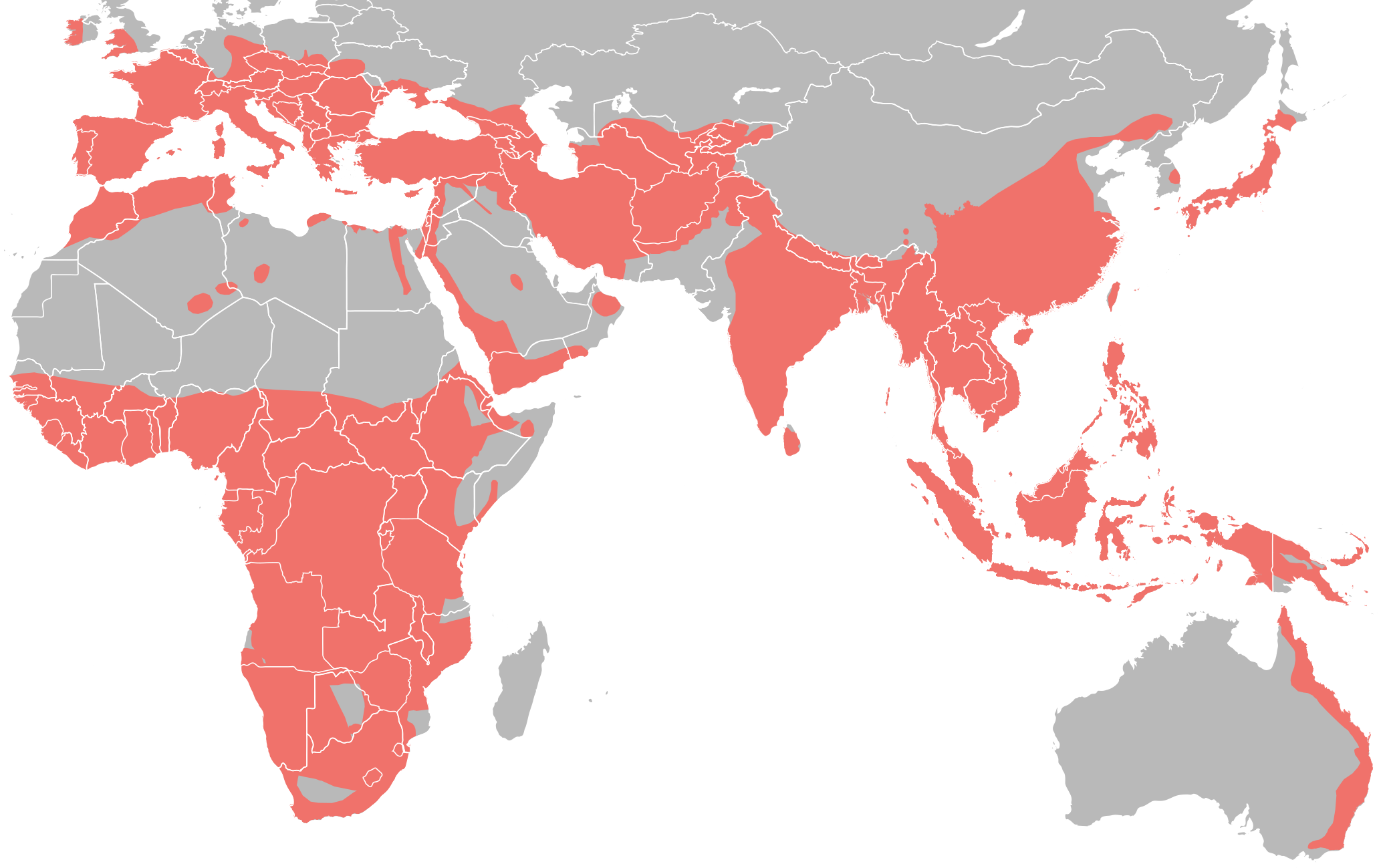
- Rhinolophidae distribution

= Horseshoe bat =

Family of mammals

Horseshoe bats are bats in the family Rhinolophidae. In addition to the single living genus, Rhinolophus, which has about 106 species, the extinct genus Palaeonycteris has been recognized. Horseshoe bats are closely related to the Old World leaf-nosed bats, family Hipposideridae, which have sometimes been included in Rhinolophidae. The horseshoe bats are divided into six subgenera and many species groups. The most recent common ancestor of all horseshoe bats lived 34–40 million years ago, though it is unclear where the geographic roots of the family are, and attempts to determine its biogeography have been indecisive. Their taxonomy is complex, as genetic evidence shows the likely existence of many cryptic species, as well as species recognized as distinct that may have little genetic divergence from previously recognized taxa. They are found in the Old World, mostly in tropical or subtropical areas, including Africa, Asia, Europe, and Oceania.

Horseshoe bats are considered small or medium-sized microbats, weighing 4–28 g (0.14–0.99 oz), with forearm lengths of 30–75 mm (1.2–3.0 in) and combined lengths of head and body of 35–110 mm (1.4–4.3 in). The fur, long and smooth in most species, can be reddish-brown, blackish, or bright orange-red. They get their common name from their large nose-leafs, which are shaped like horseshoes. The nose-leafs aid in echolocation; horseshoe bats have highly sophisticated echolocation, using constant frequency calls at high-duty cycles to detect prey in areas of high environmental clutters. They hunt insects and spiders, swooping down on prey from a perch, or gleaning from foliage. Little is known about their mating systems, but at least one species is monogamous, while another is polygynous. Gestation is approximately seven weeks and one offspring is produced at a time. A typical lifespan is six or seven years, but one greater horseshoe bat lived more than thirty years.

Horseshoe bats are relevant to humans in some regions as a source of disease, as food, and for traditional medicine. Several species are the natural reservoirs of various SARS-related coronaviruses, and data strongly suggests they are a reservoir of SARS-CoV, though humans may face more exposure risk from intermediate hosts such as masked palm civets.

They are hunted for food in several regions, particularly sub-Saharan Africa, but also Southeast Asia. Some species or their guano are used in traditional medicine in Nepal, India, Vietnam, and Senegal.

== Taxonomy and evolution ==
=== Taxonomic history ===
Rhinolophus was first described as a genus in 1799 by French naturalist Bernard Germain de Lacépède. Initially, all extant horseshoe bats were in Rhinolophus, as well as the species now in Hipposideros (roundleaf bats). At first, Rhinolophus was within the family Vespertilionidae. In 1825, British zoologist John Edward Gray subdivided Vespertilionidae into subfamilies, including what he called Rhinolophina. English zoologist Thomas Bell is credited as the first to recognize horseshoe bats as a separate family, using Rhinolophidae in 1836. While Bell is sometimes recognized as the authority for Rhinolophidae, the authority is more often given as Gray, 1825. Horseshoe bats are in the superfamily Rhinolophoidea, along with Craseonycteridae, Hipposideridae Megadermatidae, Rhinonycteridae, and Rhinopomatidae.

Attempts were made to divide Rhinolophus into other genera. In 1816, English zoologist William Elford Leach proposed the genus name Phyllorhina; Gray proposed Aquias in 1847 and Phyllotis in 1866; and German naturalist Wilhelm Peters proposed Coelophyllus in 1867. In 1876, Irish zoologist George Edward Dobson returned all Asiatic horseshoe bats to Rhinolophus, additionally proposing the subfamilies Phyllorhininae (for the hipposiderids) and Rhinolophinae. American zoologist Gerrit Smith Miller Jr. further divided the hipposiderids from the horseshoe bats in 1907, recognizing Hipposideridae as a distinct family. Some authors have considered Hipposideros and associated genera as part of Rhinolophidae as recently as the early 2000s, though they are now most often recognized as a separate family. After the split into Rhinolophidae and Hipposideridae, further divisions were proposed for Rhinolophus, with Rhinolphyllotis in 1934 and Rhinomegalophus in 1951, though both additional genera were returned to Rhinolophus.

Danish mammalogist Knud Andersen was the first to propose species groups for Rhinolophus, doing so in 1905. Species groups are a way of clustering species to reflect evolutionary relationships. He recognized six species groups: R. simplex (now R. megaphyllus), R. lepidus, R. midas (now R. hipposideros), R. philippinensis, R. macrotis, and R. arcuatus. The species have been frequently rearranged among the groups as new groups are added, new species are described, and relationships among species are revised. Fifteen species groups were given by Csorba and colleagues in 2003. Various subgenera have been proposed as well, with six listed by Csorba et al. in 2003: Aquias, Phyllorhina, Rhinolophus, Indorhinolophus, Coelophyllus, and Rhinophyllotis. Informally, the rhinolophids can be split into two major clades: the mostly African clade, and the mostly Oriental clade.

=== Evolutionary history ===
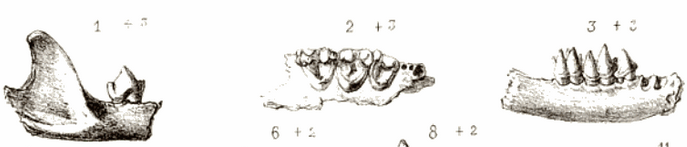
Upper and lower maxilla of the Lower Miocene fossil horseshoe bat, Palaeonycteris robustus

The most recent common ancestor of Rhinolophus lived an estimated 34–40 million years ago, splitting from the hipposiderid lineage during the Eocene. Fossilized horseshoe bats are known from Europe (early to mid-Miocene, early Oligocene), Australia (Miocene), and Africa (Miocene and late Pliocene). The biogeography of horseshoe bats is poorly understood. Various studies have proposed that the family originated in Europe, Asia, or Africa. A 2010 study supported an Asian or Oriental origin of the family, with rapid evolutionary radiations of the African and Oriental clades during the Oligocene. A 2019 study found that R. xinanzhongguoensis and R. nippon, both Eurasian species, are more closely related to African species than to other Eurasian species, suggesting that rhinolophids may have a complex biogeographical relationship with Asia and the Afrotropics.

A 2016 study using mitochondrial and nuclear DNA placed the horseshoe bats within the Yinpterochiroptera as sister to Hipposideridae.

- Chiroptera
  - - (Most microbats)
      Yangochiroptera
    - - Yinpterochiroptera
        - (Megabats)
          Pteropodidae
        - - Rhinolophoidea
            - - Rhinopomatidae
              - - Megadermatidae
                - Craseonycteridae
            - - Rhinonycteridae
              - - Hipposideridae
                - Rhinolophidae

Rhinolophidae is represented by one extant genus, Rhinolophus. Both the family and the genus are confirmed as monophyletic (containing all descendants of a common ancestor). As of 2019, there were 106 described species in Rhinolophus, making it the second-most speciose genus of bat after Myotis. Rhinolophus may be undersampled in the Afrotropical realm, with one genetic study estimating that there could be up to twelve cryptic species in the region. Additionally, some taxa recognized as full species have been found to have little genetic divergence. Rhinolophus kahuzi may be a synonym for the Ruwenzori horseshoe bat (R. ruwenzorii), and R. gorongosae or R. rhodesiae may be synonyms of the Bushveld horseshoe bat (R. simulator). Additionally, Smithers's horseshoe bat (R. smithersi), Cohen's horseshoe bat (R. cohenae), and the Mount Mabu horseshoe bat (R. mabuensis) all have little genetic divergence from Hildebrandt's horseshoe bat (R. hildebrandtii). Recognizing the former three as full species leaves Hildebrandt's horseshoe bat paraphyletic.

The second genus in Rhinolophidae is the extinct Palaeonycteris, with the type species Palaeonycteris robustus. Palaeonycteris robustus lived during the Lower Miocene and its fossilized remains were found in Saint-Gérand-le-Puy, France.

== Description ==
=== Appearance ===
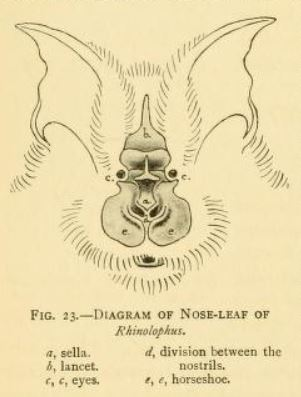
Nose-leaf diagram of a horseshoe bat

Horseshoe bats are considered small or medium microbats. Individuals have a head and body length ranging 35–110 mm (1.4–4.3 in) and have forearm lengths of 30–75 mm (1.2–3.0 in). One of the smaller species, the lesser horseshoe bat (R. hipposideros), weighs 4–10 g (0.14–0.35 oz), while one of the larger species, the greater horseshoe bat (R. ferrumequinum), weighs 16.5–28 g (0.58–0.99 oz). Fur color is highly variable among species, ranging from blackish to reddish brown to bright orange-red. The underparts are paler than the back fur. The majority of species have long, soft fur, but the woolly and lesser woolly horseshoe bats (R. luctus and R. beddomei) are unusual in their very long, woolly fur.

Like most bats, horseshoe bats have two mammary glands on their chests. Adult females additionally have two teat-like projections on their abdomens, called pubic nipples or false nipples, which are not connected to mammary glands. Only a few other bat families have pubic nipples, including Hipposideridae, Craseonycteridae, Megadermatidae, and Rhinopomatidae; they serve as attachment points for their offspring. In a few horseshoe bat species, males have a false nipple in each armpit.

=== Head and teeth ===
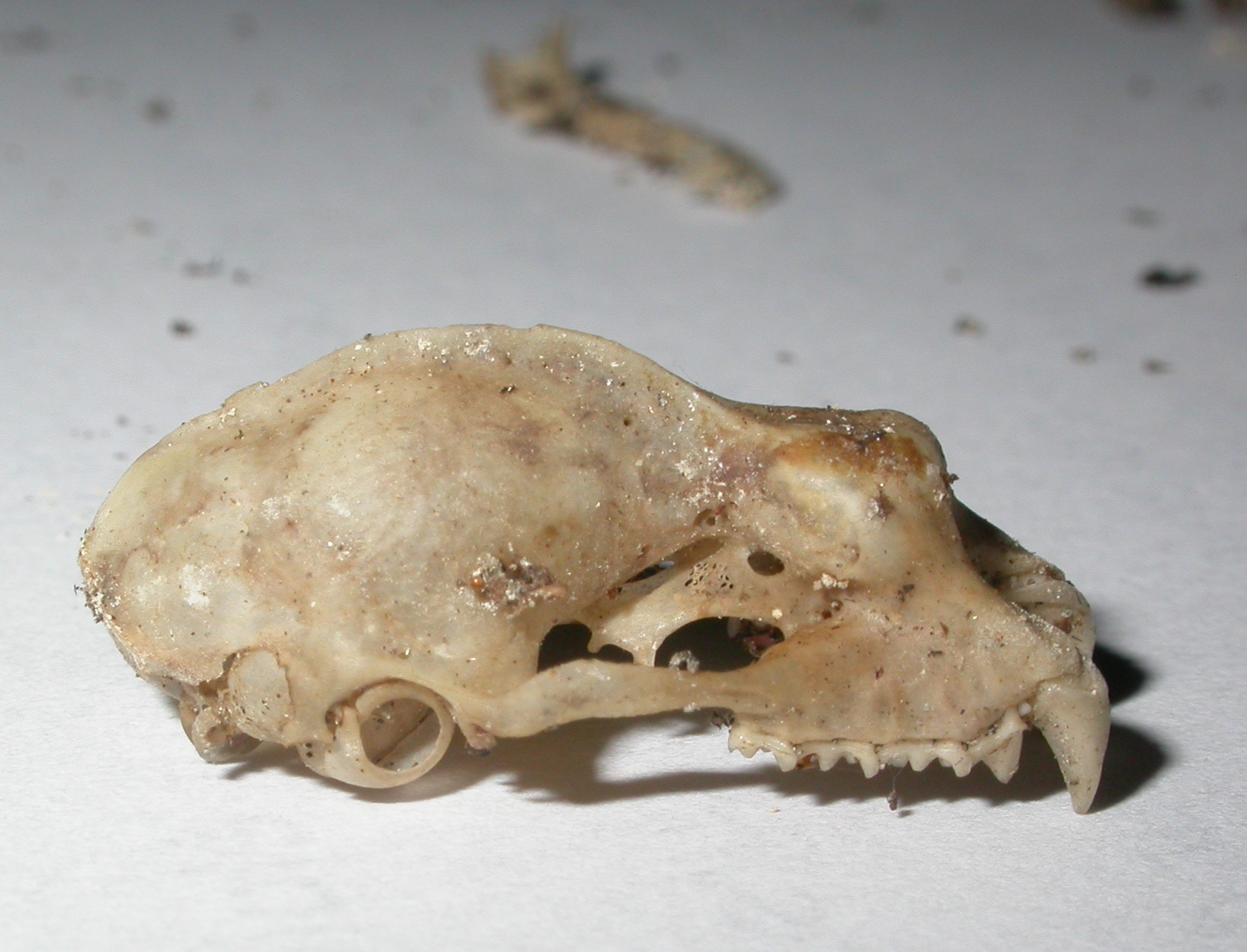
Skull of the greater horseshoe bat, showing the prominent rostral inflation on the snout

All horseshoe bats have large, leaf-like protuberances on their noses, which are called nose-leafs. The nose-leafs are important in species identification, and are composed of several parts. The front of the nose-leaf resembles and is called a horseshoe, earning them the common name of "horseshoe bats". The horseshoe is above the upper lip and is thin and flat. The lancet is triangular, pointed, and pocketed, and points up between the bats' eyes. The sella is a flat, ridge-like structure at the center of the nose. It rises from behind the nostrils and points out perpendicular from the head. Their ears are large and leaf-shaped, nearly as broad as they are long, and lack tragi. The antitragi of the ears are conspicuous. Their eyes are very small. The skull always has a rostral inflation, or bony protrusion on the snout. The typical dental formula of a horseshoe bat is 1.1.2.32.1.3.3, but the middle lower premolars are often missing, as well as the anterior upper premolars (premolars towards the front of the mouth). The young lose their milk teeth while still in utero, with the teeth resorbed into the body. They are born with the four permanent canine teeth erupted, which enables them to cling to their mothers. This is atypical among bat families, as most newborns have at least some milk teeth at birth, which are quickly replaced by the permanent set.

=== Postcrania ===
Several bones in its thorax are fused—the presternum, first rib, partial second rib, seventh cervical vertebra, first thoracic vertebra—making a solid ring. This fusion is associated with the ability to echolocate while stationary. Except for the first digit, which has two phalanges, all of their toes have three phalanges. This distinguishes them from hipposiderids, which have two phalanges in all toes. The tail is completely enclosed in the uropatagium (tail membrane), and the trailing edge of the uropatagium has calcars (cartilaginous spurs).

== Biology and ecology ==
=== Echolocation and hearing ===
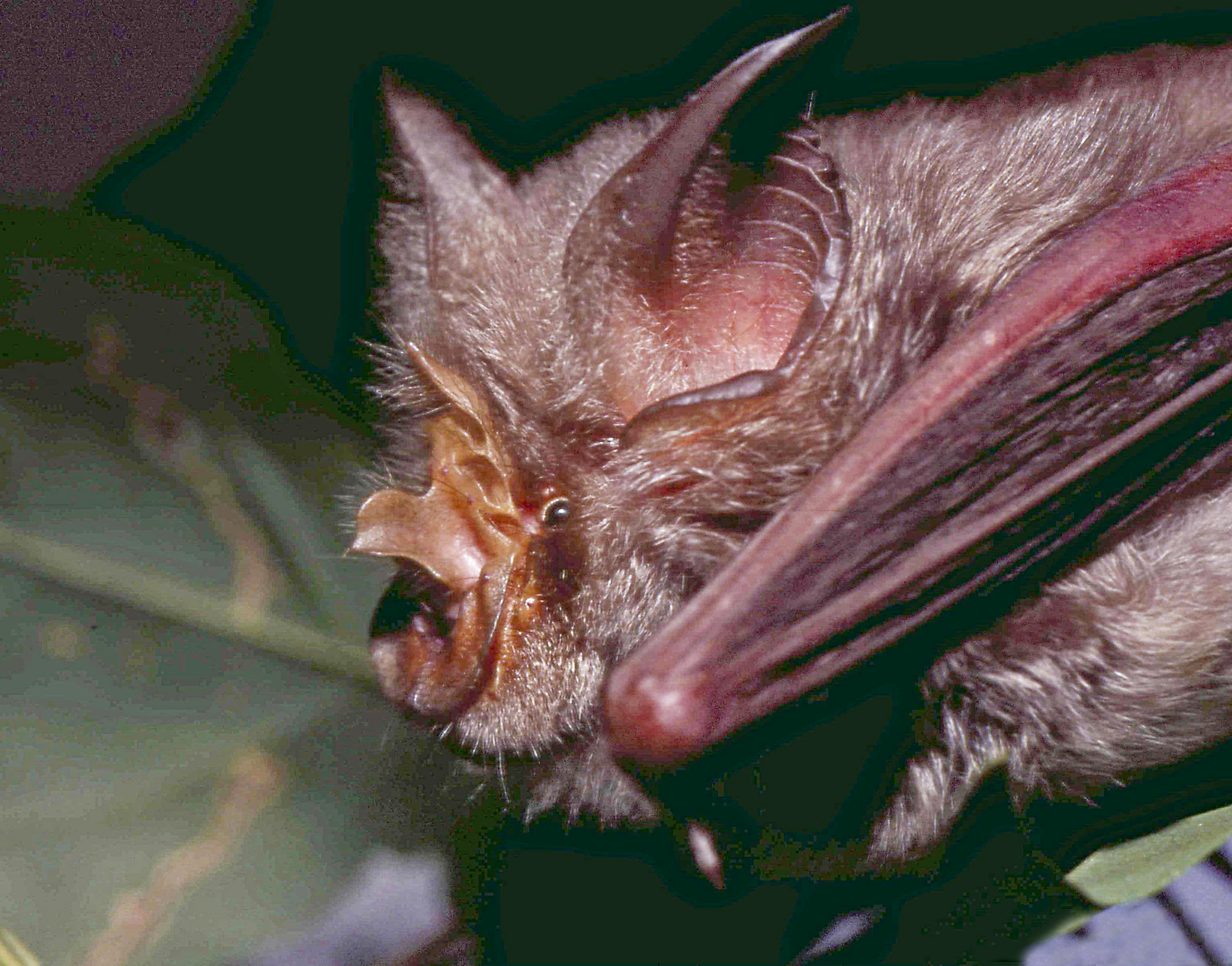
The nose-leaf helps focus echolocation; pictured is Rüppell's horseshoe bat (R. fumigatus)

Horseshoe bats have very small eyes and their field of vision is limited by their large nose-leafs; thus, vision is unlikely to be a very important sense. Instead, they use echolocation to navigate, employing some of the most sophisticated echolocation of any bat group. To echolocate, they produce sound through their nostrils. While some bats use frequency-modulated echolocation, horseshoe bats use constant-frequency echolocation (also known as single-frequency echolocation). They have high duty cycles, meaning that when individuals are calling, they are producing sound more than 30% of the time. The use of high duty, constant-frequency echolocation aids in distinguishing prey items based on size. These echolocation characteristics are typical of bats that search for moving prey items in cluttered environments full of foliage. They echolocate at particularly high frequencies for bats, though not as high as hipposiderids relative to their body sizes, and the majority concentrate most of the echolocation energy into the second harmonic. The king horseshoe bat (R. rex) and the large-eared horseshoe bat (R. philippensis) are examples of outlier species that concentrate energy into the first harmonic rather than the second. Their highly furrowed nose-leafs likely assist in focusing the emission of sound, reducing the effect of environmental clutter. The nose-leaf in general acts like a parabolic reflector, aiming the produced sound while simultaneously shielding the ear from some of it.

Horseshoe bats have sophisticated senses of hearing due to their well-developed cochlea, and are able to detect Doppler-shifted echoes. This allows them to produce and receive sounds simultaneously. Within horseshoe bats, there is a negative relationship between ear length and echolocation frequency: Species with higher echolocation frequencies tend to have shorter ear lengths. During echolocation, the ears can move independently of each other in a "flickering" motion characteristic of the family, while the head simultaneously moves up and down or side to side.

=== Diet and foraging ===
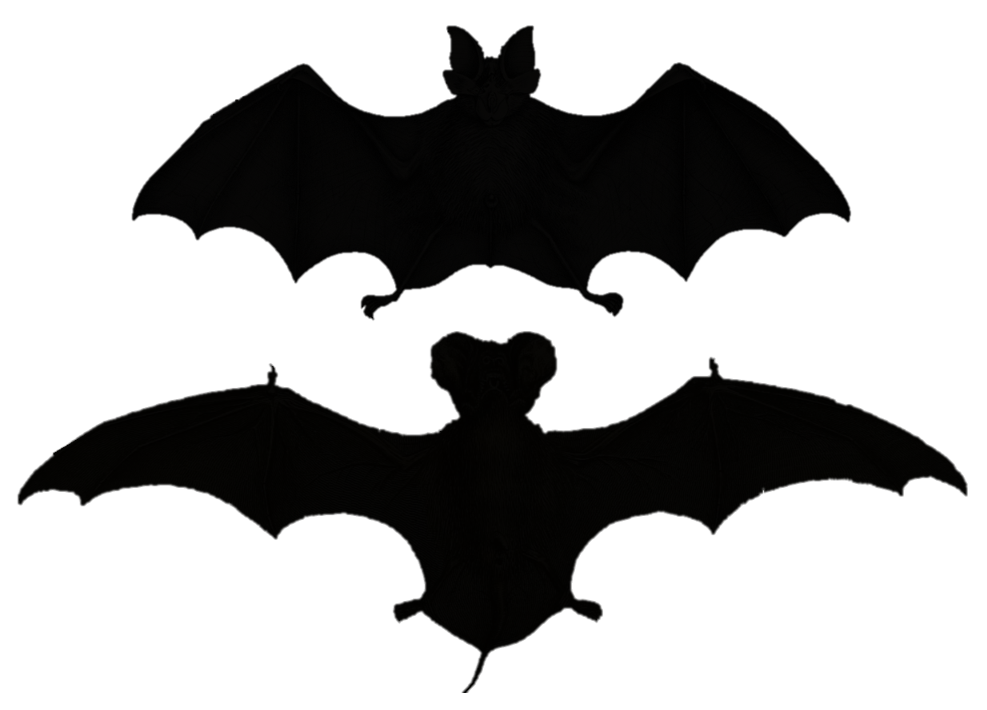
Outline of Pearson's horseshoe bat (R. pearsonii) (top) compared to the European free-tailed bat (Tadarida teniotis), which is a molossid. In comparing the two families, horseshoe bats have lower aspect ratios, lower wing loading, larger wing areas, and rounder wing tips. Molossids are adapted for fast, less maneuverable flight.

Horseshoe bats are insectivorous, though consume other arthropods such as spiders, and employ two main foraging strategies. The first strategy is flying slow and low over the ground, hunting among trees and bushes. Some species who use this strategy are able to hover over prey and glean them from the substrate. The other strategy is known as perch feeding: Individuals roost on feeding perches and wait for prey to fly past, then fly out to capture it. Foraging usually occurs 5.0–5.9 m (16.5–19.5 ft) above the ground. While vesper bats may catch prey in their uropatagia and transfer it to their mouths, horseshoe bats do not use their uropatagia to catch prey. At least one species, the greater horseshoe bat, has been documented catching prey in the tip of its wing by bending the phalanges around it, then transferring it to its mouth. While a majority of horseshoe bats are nocturnal and hunt at night, Blyth's horseshoe bat (R. lepidus) is known to forage during the daytime on Tioman Island. This is hypothesized as a response to a lack of diurnal avian (day-active bird) predators on the island.

They have especially small and rounded wingtips, low wing loading (meaning they have large wings relative to body mass), and high camber. These factors give them increased agility, and they are capable of making quick, tight turns at slow speeds. Relative to all bats, horseshoe bat wingspans are typical for their body sizes, and their aspect ratios, which relate wingspan to wing area, are average or lower than average. Some species, like Rüppell's horseshoe bat (R. fumigatus), Hildebrandt's horseshoe bat, Lander's horseshoe bat (R. landeri), and Swinny's horseshoe bat (R. swinnyi), have particularly large total wing area, though most horseshoe bat species have average wing area.

=== Reproduction and life cycle ===
The mating systems of horseshoe bats are poorly understood. A review in 2000 noted that only about 4% of species had published information about their mating systems; along with the free-tailed bats (Molossidae), they had received the least attention of any bat family relative to their species diversity. At least one species, the greater horseshoe bat, appears to have a polygynous mating system where males attempt to establish and defend territories, attracting multiple females. Rhinolophus sedulus, however, is among the few species of bat that are believed to be monogamous (only 17 bat species are recognized as such as of 2000). Some species, particularly temperate species, have an annual breeding season in the fall, while other species mate in the spring. Many horseshoe bat species have the adaptation of delayed fertilization through female sperm storage. This is especially common in temperate species. In hibernating species, the sperm storage timing coincides with hibernation. Other species like Lander's horseshoe bat have embryonic diapause, meaning that while fertilization occurs directly following copulation, the zygote does not implant into the uterine wall for an extended period of time. The greater horseshoe bat has the adaptation of delayed embryonic development, meaning that growth of the embryo is conditionally delayed if the female enters torpor. This causes the interval between fertilization and birth to vary between two and three months. Gestation takes approximately seven weeks before a single offspring is born, called a pup. Individuals reach sexual maturity by age two. While lifespans typically do not exceed six or seven years, some individuals may have extraordinarily long lives. A greater horseshoe bat individual was once banded and then rediscovered thirty years later.

=== Behavior and social systems ===
Various levels of sociality are seen in horseshoe bats. Some species are solitary, with individuals roosting alone, while others are highly colonial, forming aggregations of thousands of individuals. The majority of species are moderately social. In some species, the sexes segregate annually when females form maternity colonies, though the sexes remain together all year in others. Individuals hunt solitarily. Because their hind limbs are poorly developed, they cannot scuttle on flat surfaces nor climb adeptly like other bats.

Horseshoe bats enter torpor to conserve energy. During torpor, their body temperature drops to as low as 16 °C (61 °F) and their metabolic rates slow. Torpor is employed by horseshoe bats in temperate, sub-tropical, and tropical regions. Torpor has a short duration; when torpor is employed consistently for days, weeks, or months, it is known as hibernation. Hibernation is used by horseshoe bats in temperate regions during the winter months.

=== Predators and parasites ===
Overall, bats have few natural predators. Horseshoe bat predators include birds in the order Accipitriformes (hawks, eagles, and kites), as well as falcons and owls. Snakes may also prey on some species while they roost in caves, and domestic cats may hunt them as well. A 2019 study near a colony of bats in central Italy found that 30% of examined cat feces contained the remains of greater horseshoe bats.

Horseshoe bats have a variety of internal and external parasites. External parasites (ectoparasites) include mites in the genus Eyndhovenia, "bat flies" of the families Streblidae and Nycteribiidae, ticks of the genus Ixodes, and fleas of the genus Rhinolophopsylla. They are also affected by a variety of internal parasites (endoparasites), including trematodes of the genera Lecithodendrium, Plagiorchis, Prosthodendrium, and cestodes of the genus Potorolepsis.

== Range and habitat ==
Horseshoe bats have a mostly Paleotropical distribution, though some species are in the southern Palearctic realm. They are found in the Old World, including Africa, Australia, Asia, Europe, and Oceania. The greater horseshoe bat has the greatest geographic range of any horseshoe bat, occurring across Europe, North Africa, Japan, China, and southern Asia. Other species are much more restricted, like the Andaman horseshoe bat (R. cognatus), which is only found on the Andaman Islands. They roost in a variety of places, including buildings, caves, tree hollows, and foliage. They occur in both forested and unforested habitat, with the majority of species occurring in tropical or subtropical areas. For the species that hibernate, they select caves with an ambient temperature of approximately 11 °C (52 °F).

== Relationship to humans ==
=== As disease reservoirs ===
==== Coronaviruses ====
Number of SARS-related coronaviruses (SARSr-CoVs) by bat species
| Bat species | No. SARSr-CoVs |
|---|---|
| Chinese rufous horseshoe bat | 30 |
| Greater horseshoe bat | 9 |
| Big-eared horseshoe bat | 2 |
| Least horseshoe bat | 2 |
| Intermediate horseshoe bat | 1 |
| Blasius's horseshoe bat | 1 |
| Stoliczka's trident bat | 1 |
| Wrinkle-lipped free-tailed bat | 1 |

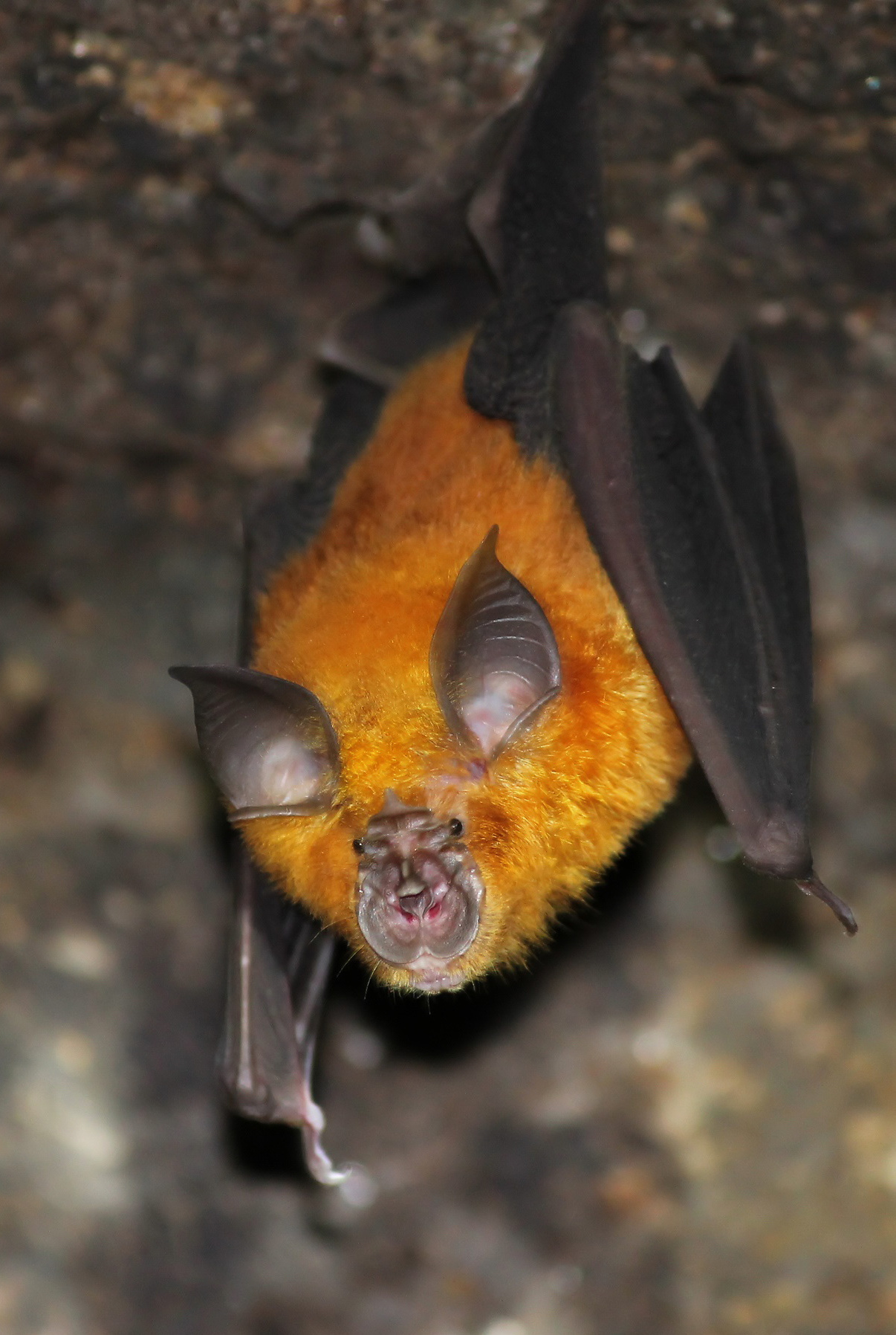
The rufous horseshoe bat (R. rouxii) has tested seropositive for Kyasanur Forest disease, which is transmitted to humans by ticks.

Horseshoe bats are of particular interest to public health and zoonosis as a source of coronaviruses.

Following the 2002–2004 SARS outbreak, several animal species were examined as possible natural reservoirs of the causative coronavirus, SARS-CoV. From 2003 to 2018, forty-seven SARS-related coronaviruses were detected in horseshoe bats. In 2019, a wet market in Wuhan, China, was linked to the outbreak of SARS-CoV-2. Genetic analyses of SARS-CoV-2 showed that it was highly similar to viruses found in horseshoe bats.

After the SARS outbreak, the least horseshoe bat (R. pusillus) was seropositive, the greater horseshoe bat tested positive for the virus only, and the big-eared horseshoe bat (R. macrotis), Chinese rufous horseshoe bat (R. sinicus), and Pearson's horseshoe bat (R. pearsoni) were both seropositive and tested positive for the virus. The bats' viruses were highly similar to SARS-CoV, with 88–92% similarity. Intraspecies diversity of SARS-like coronaviruses appears to have arisen in Rhinolophus sinicus by homologous recombination. R. sinicus likely harbored the direct ancestor of SARS-CoV in humans. Though horseshoe bats appeared to be the natural reservoir of SARS-related coronaviruses, humans likely became sick through contact with infected masked palm civets, which were identified as intermediate hosts of the virus.

During the period from 2003 to 2018, forty-seven SARS-related coronaviruses were detected in bats, forty-five in horseshoe bats. Thirty SARS-related coronaviruses were from Chinese rufous horseshoe bats, nine from greater horseshoe bats, two from big-eared horseshoe bats, two from the least horseshoe bat, and one each from the intermediate horseshoe bat (R. affinis), Blasius's horseshoe bat (R. blasii), Stoliczka's trident bat (Aselliscus stoliczkanus), and the wrinkle-lipped free-tailed bat (Chaerephon plicata).

In the market in Wuhan where the SARS-CoV-2 was detected, 96% had a similarity to a virus isolated from the intermediate horseshoe bat. Research on the evolutionary origins of SARS-CoV-2 indicates that bats were the natural reservoirs of SARS-CoV-2. It is yet unclear how the virus was transmitted to humans, though an intermediate host may have been involved. It was once believed to be the Sunda pangolin, but a July 2020 publication found no evidence of transmission from pangolins to humans.

==== Other viruses ====
They are also associated with viruses like orthoreoviruses, flaviviruses, and hantaviruses. They have tested positive for Mammalian orthoreovirus (MRV), including a type 1 MRV isolated from the lesser horseshoe bat and a type 2 MRV isolated from the least horseshoe bat. The specific MRVs found in horseshoe bats have not been linked to human infection, though humans can become ill through exposure to other MRVs. The rufous horseshoe bat (R. rouxii) has tested seropositive for Kyasanur Forest disease, which is a tick-borne viral hemorrhagic fever known from southern India. Kyasanur Forest disease is transmitted to humans through the bite of infected ticks, and has a mortality rate of 2–10%. Longquan virus, a kind of hantavirus, has been detected in the intermediate horseshoe bat, Chinese rufous horseshoe bat, and the little Japanese horseshoe bat (R. cornutus).

=== As food and medicine ===
Microbats are not hunted nearly as intensely as megabats: only 8% of insectivorous species are hunted for food, compared to half of all megabat species in the Old World tropics. Horseshoe bats are hunted for food, particularly in sub-Saharan Africa. Species hunted in Africa include the halcyon horseshoe bat (R. alcyone), Guinean horseshoe bat (R. guineensis), Hill's horseshoe bat (R. hilli), Hills' horseshoe bat (R. hillorum), Maclaud's horseshoe bat (R. maclaudi), the Ruwenzori horseshoe bat, the forest horseshoe bat (R. silvestris), and the Ziama horseshoe bat (R. ziama). In Southeast Asia, Marshall's horseshoe bat (R. marshalli) is consumed in Myanmar and the large rufous horseshoe bat (R. rufus) is consumed in the Philippines.

The Ao Naga people of Northeast India are reported to use the flesh of horseshoe bats to treat asthma. Ecological anthropologist Will Tuladhar-Douglas stated that the Newar people of Nepal "almost certainly" use horseshoe bats, among other species, to prepare Cikā Lāpa Wasa ("bat oil"). Dead bats are rolled up and placed in tightly sealed jars of mustard oil; the oil is ready when it gives off a distinct and unpleasant smell. Traditional medicinal uses of the bat oil include removing "earbugs", reported to be millipedes that crawl into one's ears and gnaw at the brain, possibly a traditional explanation of migraines. It is also used as a purported treatment for baldness and partial paralysis. In Senegal, there are anecdotal reports of horseshoe bats being used in potions to treat mental illness; in Vietnam, a pharmaceutical company reported using 50 t (50,000 kg) of horseshoe bat guano each year for medicinal uses.

== Conservation ==
1. Critically endangered (1.10%)
2. Endangered (13.8%)
3. Vulnerable (5.30%)
4. Near-threatened (9.60%)
5. Least concern (54.3%)
6. Data deficient (16.0%)

As of 2023, the IUCN had evaluated 94 species of horseshoe bat. They have the following IUCN statuses:

- Critically endangered: 1 species (Hill's horseshoe bat)
- Endangered: 13 species
- Vulnerable: 5 species
- Near threatened: 9 species
- Least concern: 51 species
- Data deficient: 15 species

Like all cave-roosting bats, cave-roosting horseshoe bats are vulnerable to disturbance of their cave habitats. Disturbance can include mining bat guano, quarrying limestone, and cave tourism.
