= List of mammals of Senegal =

This is a list of the mammal species recorded in Senegal. Of the mammal species in Senegal, one is critically endangered, three are endangered, eleven are vulnerable, and three are near threatened. One of the species listed for Senegal can no longer be found in the wild.

The following tags are used to highlight each species' conservation status as assessed by the International Union for Conservation of Nature:

EX	Extinct	No reasonable doubt that the last individual has died.
EW	Extinct in the wild	Known only to survive in captivity or as a naturalized populations well outside its previous range.
CR	Critically endangered	The species is in imminent risk of extinction in the wild.
EN	Endangered	The species is facing an extremely high risk of extinction in the wild.
VU	Vulnerable	The species is facing a high risk of extinction in the wild.
NT	Near threatened	The species does not meet any of the criteria that would categorise it as risking extinction but it is likely to do so in the future.
LC	Least concern	There are no current identifiable risks to the species.
DD	Data deficient	There is inadequate information to make an assessment of the risks to this species.

Some species were assessed using an earlier set of criteria. Species assessed using this system have the following instead of near threatened and least concern categories:

LR/cd	Lower risk/conservation dependent	Species which were the focus of conservation programmes and may have moved into a higher risk category if that programme was discontinued.
LR/nt	Lower risk/near threatened	Species which are close to being classified as vulnerable but are not the subject of conservation programmes.
LR/lc	Lower risk/least concern	Species for which there are no identifiable risks.

== Order: Tubulidentata (aardvarks) ==
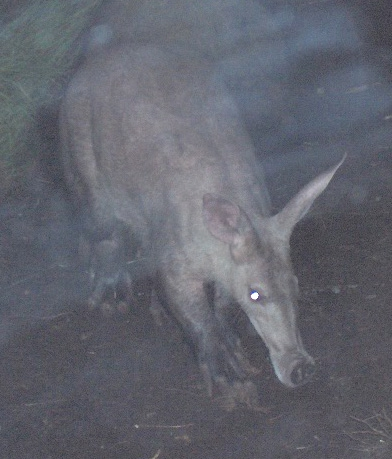
Aardvark

The order Tubulidentata consists of a single species, the aardvark. Tubulidentata are characterised by their teeth which lack a pulp cavity and form thin tubes which are continuously worn down and replaced.

- Family: Orycteropodidae
  - Genus: Orycteropus
    - Aardvark, O. afer LC

== Order: Hyracoidea (hyraxes) ==
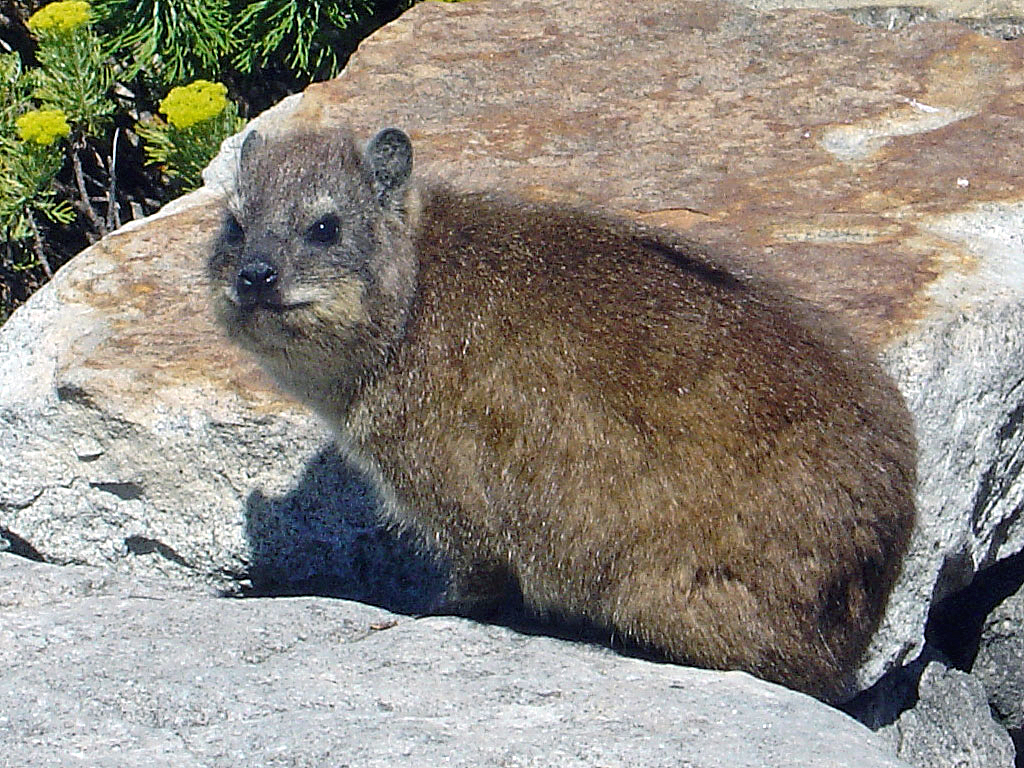
Cape hyrax

The hyraxes are any of four species of fairly small, thickset, herbivorous mammals in the order Hyracoidea. About the size of a domestic cat they are well-furred, with rounded bodies and a stumpy tail. They are native to Africa and the Middle East.

- Family: Procaviidae (hyraxes)
  - Genus: Dendrohyrax
    - Western tree hyrax, D. dorsalis LC
  - Genus: Procavia
    - Cape hyrax, P. capensis LC

== Order: Proboscidea (elephants) ==
The elephants comprise three living species and are the largest living land animals.

- Family: Elephantidae (elephants)
  - Genus: Loxodonta
    - African forest elephant, L. cyclotis CR

== Order: Sirenia (manatees and dugongs) ==
Sirenia is an order of fully aquatic, herbivorous mammals that inhabit rivers, estuaries, coastal marine waters, swamps, and marine wetlands. All four species are endangered.

- Family: Trichechidae
  - Genus: Trichechus
    - African manatee, Trichechus senegalensis VU

== Order: Primates ==
The order Primates contains humans and their closest relatives: lemurs, lorisoids, tarsiers, monkeys, and apes.

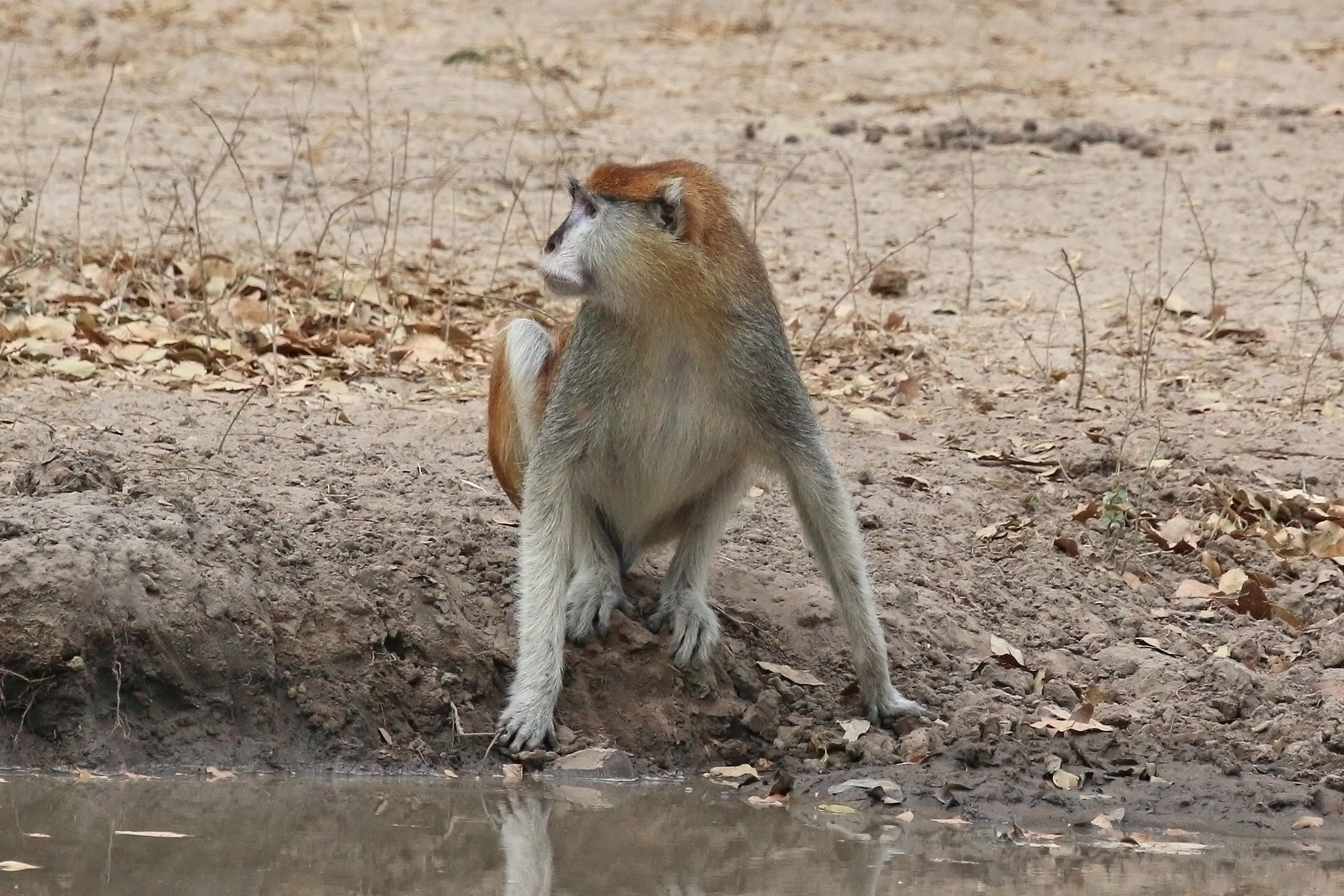
Patas monkey

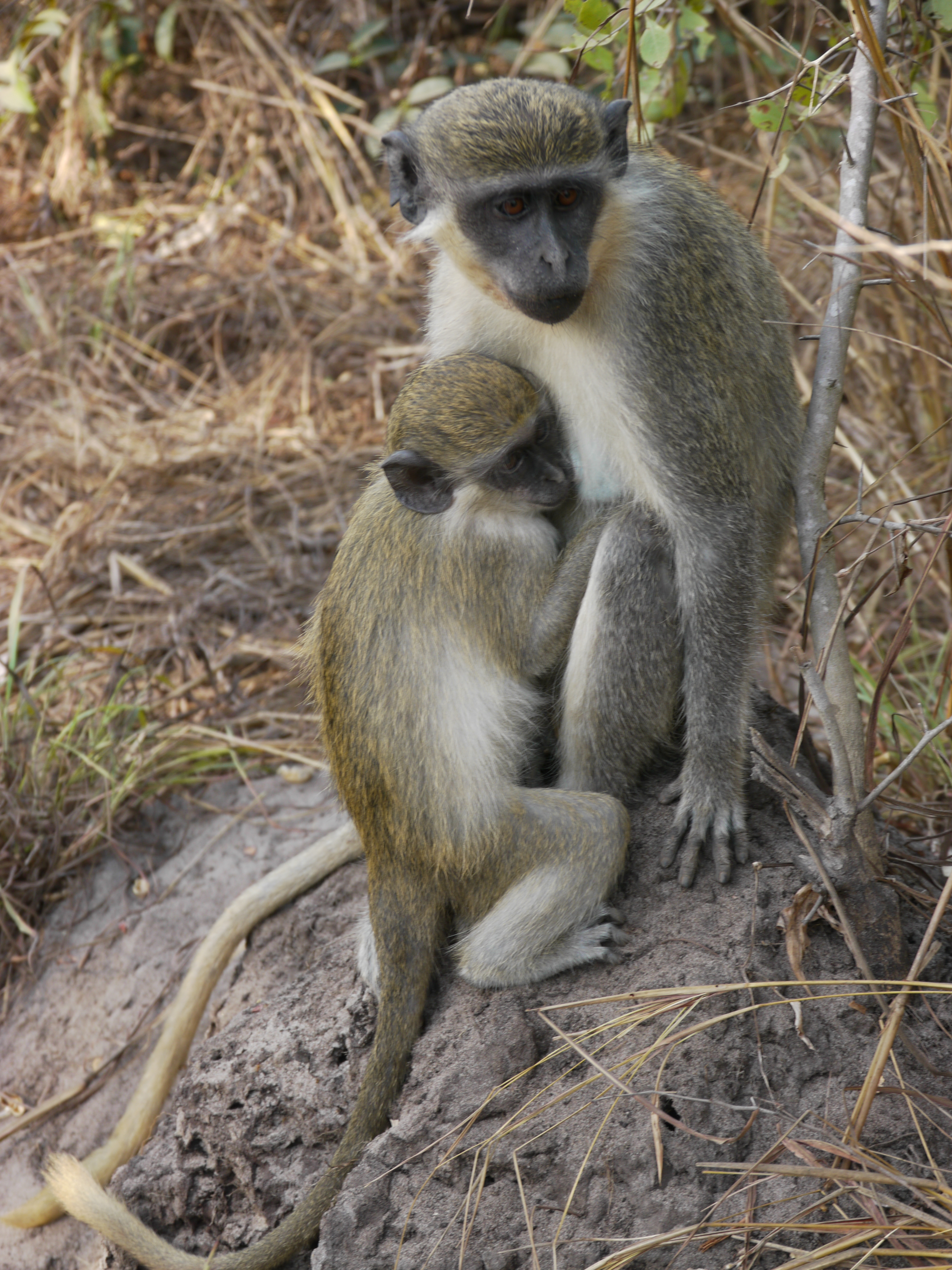
Green monkey

- Suborder: Strepsirrhini
  - Infraorder: Lemuriformes
    - Superfamily: Lorisoidea
      - Family: Lorisidae
        - Genus: Perodicticus
          - Potto, Perodicticus potto LC
      - Family: Galagidae
        - Genus: Galago
          - Senegal bushbaby, Galago senegalensis LC
- Suborder: Haplorhini
  - Infraorder: Simiiformes
    - Parvorder: Catarrhini
      - Superfamily: Cercopithecoidea
        - Family: Cercopithecidae (Old World monkeys)
          - Genus: Erythrocebus
            - Patas monkey, Erythrocebus patas LC
          - Genus: Chlorocebus
            - Green monkey, Chlorocebus sabaeus LC
          - Genus: Cercopithecus
            - Campbell's mona monkey, Cercopithecus campbelli VU
            - Lesser spot-nosed monkey, Cercopithecus petaurista LC
          - Genus: Papio
            - Guinea baboon, Papio papio NT
          - Genus: Cercocebus
            - Sooty mangabey, Cercocebus atys NT
          - Subfamily: Colobinae
            - Genus: Colobus
              - King colobus, Colobus polykomos VU
            - Genus: Procolobus
              - Red colobus, Procolobus badius EN
      - Superfamily: Hominoidea
        - Family: Hominidae (great apes)
          - Subfamily: Homininae
            - Tribe: Panini
              - Genus: Pan
                - Common chimpanzee, Pan troglodytes EN

== Order: Rodentia (rodents) ==
Rodents make up the largest order of mammals, with over 40% of mammalian species. They have two incisors in the upper and lower jaw which grow continually and must be kept short by gnawing. Most rodents are small though the capybara can weigh up to 45 kg (100 lb).

- Suborder: Hystricomorpha
  - Family: Hystricidae (Old World porcupines)
    - Genus: Hystrix
      - Crested porcupine, Hystrix cristata LC
  - Family: Ctenodactylidae
    - Genus: Felovia
      - Felou gundi, Felovia vae DD
  - Family: Thryonomyidae (cane rats)
    - Genus: Thryonomys
      - Greater cane rat, Thryonomys swinderianus LC
- Suborder: Sciurognathi
  - Family: Anomaluridae
    - Subfamily: Anomalurinae
      - Genus: Anomalurops
        - Beecroft's scaly-tailed squirrel, Anomalurops beecrofti LC
  - Family: Sciuridae (squirrels)
    - Subfamily: Xerinae
      - Tribe: Xerini
        - Genus: Xerus
          - Striped ground squirrel, Xerus erythropus LC
      - Tribe: Protoxerini
        - Genus: Funisciurus
          - Fire-footed rope squirrel, Funisciurus pyrropus LC
        - Genus: Heliosciurus
          - Gambian sun squirrel, Heliosciurus gambianus LC
          - Red-legged sun squirrel, Heliosciurus rufobrachium LC
  - Family: Gliridae (dormice)
    - Subfamily: Graphiurinae
      - Genus: Graphiurus
        - Kellen's dormouse, Graphiurus kelleni LC
  - Family: Dipodidae (jerboas)
    - Subfamily: Dipodinae
      - Genus: Jaculus
        - Lesser Egyptian jerboa, Jaculus jaculus LC
  - Family: Nesomyidae
    - Subfamily: Dendromurinae
      - Genus: Steatomys
        - Northwestern fat mouse, Steatomys caurinus LC
        - Dainty fat mouse, Steatomys cuppedius LC
    - Subfamily: Cricetomyinae
      - Genus: Cricetomys
        - Gambian pouched rat, Cricetomys gambianus LC
  - Family: Muridae (mice, rats, voles, gerbils, hamsters, etc.)
    - Subfamily: Deomyinae
      - Genus: Uranomys
        - Rudd's mouse, Uranomys ruddi LC
    - Subfamily: Gerbillinae
      - Genus: Desmodilliscus
        - Pouched gerbil, Desmodilliscus braueri LC
      - Genus: Gerbillus
        - Pygmy gerbil, Gerbillus henleyi LC
        - Tarabul's gerbil, Gerbillus tarabuli LC
      - Genus: Gerbilliscus
        - Kemp's gerbil, Gerbilliscus kempi LC
        - Guinean gerbil, Gerbilliscus guineae LC
      - Genus: Taterillus
        - Gracile tateril, Taterillus gracilis LC
        - Senegal gerbil, Taterillus pygargus LC
    - Subfamily: Murinae
      - Genus: Arvicanthis
        - Sudanian grass rat, Arvicanthis ansorgei LC
        - African grass rat, Arvicanthis niloticus LC
      - Genus: Dasymys
        - West African shaggy rat, Dasymys rufulus LC
      - Genus: Grammomys
        - Bunting's thicket rat, Grammomys buntingi DD
      - Genus: Lemniscomys
        - Senegal one-striped grass mouse, Lemniscomys linulus DD
        - Heuglin's striped grass mouse, Lemniscomys zebra LC
      - Genus: Mastomys
        - Guinea multimammate mouse, Mastomys erythroleucus LC
        - Hubert's multimammate mouse, Mastomys huberti LC
        - Natal multimammate mouse, Mastomys natalensis LC
      - Genus: Mus
        - Hausa mouse, Mus haussa LC
        - Matthey's mouse, Mus mattheyi LC
        - African pygmy mouse, Mus minutoides LC
      - Genus: Praomys
        - Dalton's mouse, Praomys daltoni LC
        - Tullberg's soft-furred mouse, Praomys tullbergi LC

== Order: Lagomorpha (lagomorphs) ==
The lagomorphs comprise two families, Leporidae with hares and rabbits, and Ochotonidae with pikas. Though they can resemble rodents, and were classified as a superfamily in that order until the early 20th century, they have since been considered a separate order. They differ from rodents in a number of physical characteristics, such as having four incisors in the upper jaw rather than two.

- Family: Leporidae
  - Genus: Lepus
    - Cape hare, Lepus capensis LC
    - African savanna hare, Lepus microtis LC

== Order: Erinaceomorpha (hedgehogs and gymnures) ==
The order Erinaceomorpha contains a single family, Erinaceidae, which comprise the hedgehogs and gymnures. The hedgehogs are easily recognised by their spines while gymnures look more like large rats.

- Family: Erinaceidae (hedgehogs)
  - Subfamily: Erinaceinae
    - Genus: Atelerix
      - Four-toed hedgehog, Atelerix albiventris LC

== Order: Soricomorpha (shrews, moles, and solenodons) ==
The "shrew-forms" are insectivorous mammals. The shrews and solenodons closely resemble mice while the moles are stout-bodied burrowers.

- Family: Soricidae (shrews)
  - Subfamily: Crocidurinae
    - Genus: Crocidura
      - Cinderella shrew, Crocidura cinderella LC
      - Fox's shrew, Crocidura foxi LC
      - Bicolored musk shrew, Crocidura fuscomurina LC
      - Lamotte's shrew, Crocidura lamottei LC
      - Mauritanian shrew, Crocidura lusitania LC
      - Savanna dwarf shrew, Crocidura nanilla LC
      - African giant shrew, Crocidura olivieri LC
      - Desert musk shrew, Crocidura smithii LC
      - Savanna path shrew, Crocidura viaria LC

== Order: Chiroptera (bats) ==
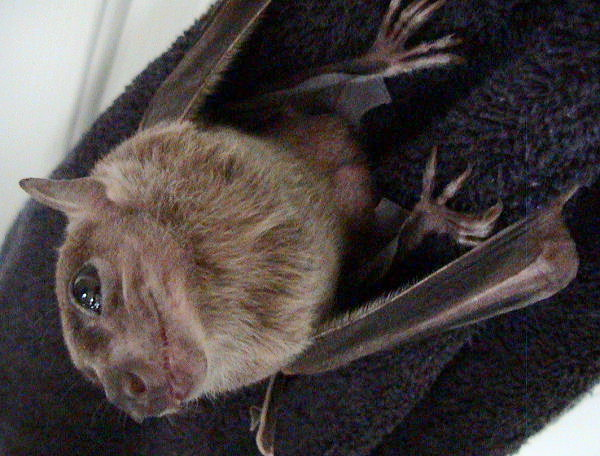
Egyptian fruit bat

The bats' most distinguishing feature is that their forelimbs are developed as wings, making them the only mammals capable of flight. Bat species account for about 20% of all mammals.

- Family: Pteropodidae (flying foxes, Old World fruit bats)
  - Subfamily: Pteropodinae
    - Genus: Eidolon
      - Straw-coloured fruit bat, Eidolon helvum LC
    - Genus: Epomophorus
      - Gambian epauletted fruit bat, Epomophorus gambianus LC
    - Genus: Epomops
      - Buettikofer's epauletted fruit bat, Epomops buettikoferi LC
    - Genus: Lissonycteris
      - Smith's fruit bat, Lissonycteris smithi LC
    - Genus: Micropteropus
      - Peters's dwarf epauletted fruit bat, Micropteropus pusillus LC
    - Genus: Rousettus
      - Egyptian fruit bat, Rousettus aegyptiacus LC
- Family: Vespertilionidae
  - Subfamily: Myotinae
    - Genus: Myotis
      - Rufous mouse-eared bat, Myotis bocagii LC
  - Subfamily: Vespertilioninae
    - Genus: Barbastella
      - Barbastelle, Barbastella barbastellus VU
    - Genus: Eptesicus
      - Lagos serotine, Eptesicus platyops DD
    - Genus: Glauconycteris
      - Abo bat, Glauconycteris poensis LC
      - Butterfly bat, Glauconycteris variegata LC
    - Genus: Neoromicia
      - Tiny serotine, Neoromicia guineensis LC
      - Banana pipistrelle, Neoromicia nanus LC
      - Rendall's serotine, Neoromicia rendalli LC
      - Somali serotine, Neoromicia somalicus LC
      - White-winged serotine, Neoromicia tenuipinnis LC
    - Genus: Nycticeinops
      - Schlieffen's bat, Nycticeinops schlieffeni LC
    - Genus: Pipistrellus
      - Egyptian pipistrelle, Pipistrellus deserti LC
      - Tiny pipistrelle, Pipistrellus nanulus LC
      - Rüppell's pipistrelle, Pipistrellus rueppelli LC
      - Rusty pipistrelle, Pipistrellus rusticus LC
    - Genus: Scotoecus
      - Light-winged lesser house bat, Scotoecus albofuscus DD
      - Dark-winged lesser house bat, Scotoecus hirundo DD
    - Genus: Scotophilus
      - African yellow bat, Scotophilus dinganii LC
      - White-bellied yellow bat, Scotophilus leucogaster LC
      - Schreber's yellow bat, Scotophilus nigrita NT
      - Greenish yellow bat, Scotophilus viridis LC
- Family: Rhinopomatidae
  - Genus: Rhinopoma
    - Greater mouse-tailed bat, Rhinopoma microphyllum LC
- Family: Molossidae
  - Genus: Chaerephon
    - Gland-tailed free-tailed bat, Chaerephon bemmeleni LC
    - Little free-tailed bat, Chaerephon pumila LC
  - Genus: Mops
    - Angolan free-tailed bat, Mops condylurus LC
    - Midas free-tailed bat, Mops midas LC
  - Genus: Myopterus
    - Daubenton's free-tailed bat, Myopterus daubentonii NT
- Family: Emballonuridae
  - Genus: Taphozous
    - Mauritian tomb bat, Taphozous mauritianus LC
    - Naked-rumped tomb bat, Taphozous nudiventris LC
    - Egyptian tomb bat, Taphozous perforatus LC
- Family: Nycteridae
  - Genus: Nycteris
    - Gambian slit-faced bat, Nycteris gambiensis LC
    - Large slit-faced bat, Nycteris grandis LC
    - Hairy slit-faced bat, Nycteris hispida LC
    - Large-eared slit-faced bat, Nycteris macrotis LC
    - Egyptian slit-faced bat, Nycteris thebaica LC
- Family: Megadermatidae
  - Genus: Lavia
    - Yellow-winged bat, Lavia frons LC
- Family: Rhinolophidae
  - Subfamily: Rhinolophinae
    - Genus: Rhinolophus
      - Halcyon horseshoe bat, Rhinolophus alcyone LC
      - Rüppell's horseshoe bat, Rhinolophus fumigatus LC
      - Guinean horseshoe bat, Rhinolophus guineensis VU
      - Lander's horseshoe bat, Rhinolophus landeri LC
  - Subfamily: Hipposiderinae
    - Genus: Asellia
      - Trident leaf-nosed bat, Asellia tridens LC
    - Genus: Hipposideros
      - Aba roundleaf bat, Hipposideros abae NT
      - Sundevall's roundleaf bat, Hipposideros caffer LC
      - Cyclops roundleaf bat, Hipposideros cyclops LC
      - Giant roundleaf bat, Hipposideros gigas LC
      - Noack's roundleaf bat, Hipposideros ruber LC

== Order: Pholidota (pangolins) ==
The order Pholidota comprises the eight species of pangolin. Pangolins are anteaters and have the powerful claws, elongated snout and long tongue seen in the other unrelated anteater species.

- Family: Manidae
  - Genus: Manis
    - Giant pangolin, M. gigantea EN
    - Long-tailed pangolin, M. tetradactyla VU
    - Tree pangolin, M. tricuspis VU

== Order: Cetacea (whales) ==
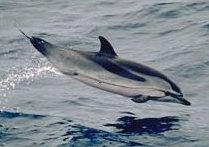
Striped dolphin

The order Cetacea includes whales, dolphins and porpoises. They are the mammals most fully adapted to aquatic life with a spindle-shaped nearly hairless body, protected by a thick layer of blubber, and forelimbs and tail modified to provide propulsion underwater.

- Suborder: Mysticeti
  - Family: Balaenopteridae
    - Subfamily: Balaenopterinae
      - Genus: Balaenoptera
        - Common minke whale, Balaenoptera acutorostrata VU
        - Sei whale, Balaenoptera borealis EN
        - Bryde's whale, Balaenoptera brydei EN
        - Blue whale, Balaenoptera musculus EN
        - Fin whale, Balaenoptera physalus EN
    - Subfamily: Megapterinae
      - Genus: Megaptera
        - Humpback whale, Megaptera novaeangliae VU
  - Family: Balaenidae (right whales)
    - Genus: Eubalaena
      - North Atlantic right whale CR (Seen historically)
- Suborder: Odontoceti
  - Superfamily: Platanistoidea
    - Family: Phocoenidae
      - Genus: Phocoena
        - Harbour porpoise, Phocoena phocoena VU
    - Family: Physeteridae
      - Genus: Physeter
        - Sperm whale, Physeter macrocephalus VU
    - Family: Kogiidae
      - Genus: Kogia
        - Pygmy sperm whale, Kogia breviceps DD
        - Dwarf sperm whale, Kogia sima DD
    - Family: Ziphidae
      - Genus: Mesoplodon
        - Blainville's beaked whale, Mesoplodon densirostris DD
        - Gervais' beaked whale, Mesoplodon europaeus DD
      - Genus: Ziphius
        - Cuvier's beaked whale, Ziphius cavirostris DD
    - Family: Delphinidae (marine dolphins)
        - Genus: Orcinus
        - Killer whale, Orcinus orca DD
        - Genus: Feresa
        - Pygmy killer whale, Feresa attenuata DD
        - Genus: Pseudorca
        - False killer whale, Pseudorca crassidens DD
      - Genus: Delphinus
        - Short-beaked common dolphin, Delphinus delphis LR/cd
      - Genus: Lagenodelphis
        - Fraser's dolphin, Lagenodelphis hosei DD
      - Genus: Stenella
        - Pantropical spotted dolphin, Stenella attenuata LR/cd
        - Clymene dolphin, Stenella clymene DD
        - Striped dolphin, Stenella coeruleoalba DD
        - Atlantic spotted dolphin, Stenella frontalis DD
        - Spinner dolphin, Stenella longirostris LR/cd
      - Genus: Steno
        - Rough-toothed dolphin, Steno bredanensis DD
      - Genus: Tursiops
        - Common bottlenose dolphin, Tursiops truncatus LC
      - Genus: Globicephala
        - Short-finned pilot whale, Globicephala macrorhynchus DD
      - Genus: Grampus
        - Risso's dolphin, Grampus griseus DD
      - Genus: Peponocephala
        - Melon-headed whale, Peponocephala electra DD

== Order: Carnivora (carnivorans) ==
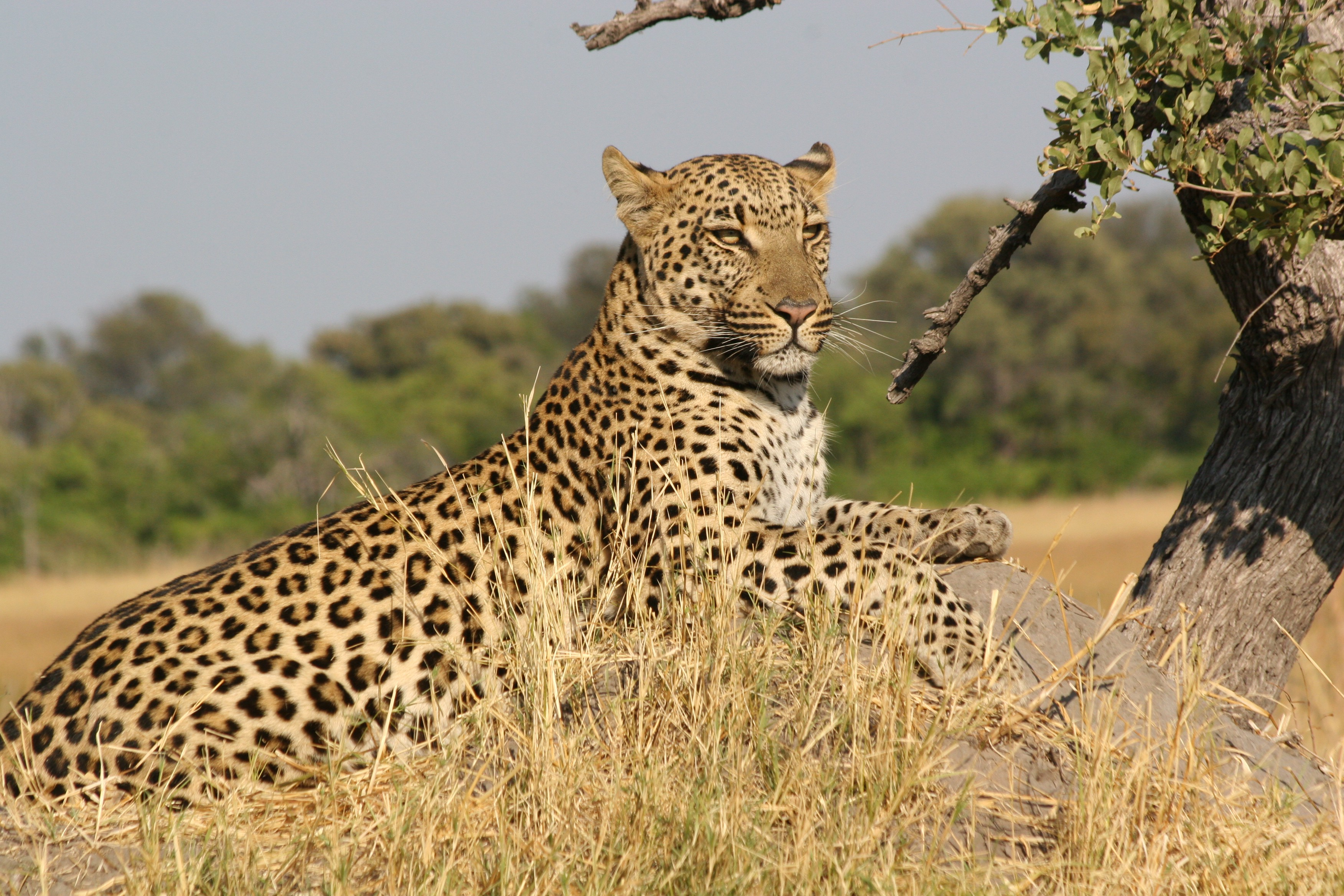
African leopard

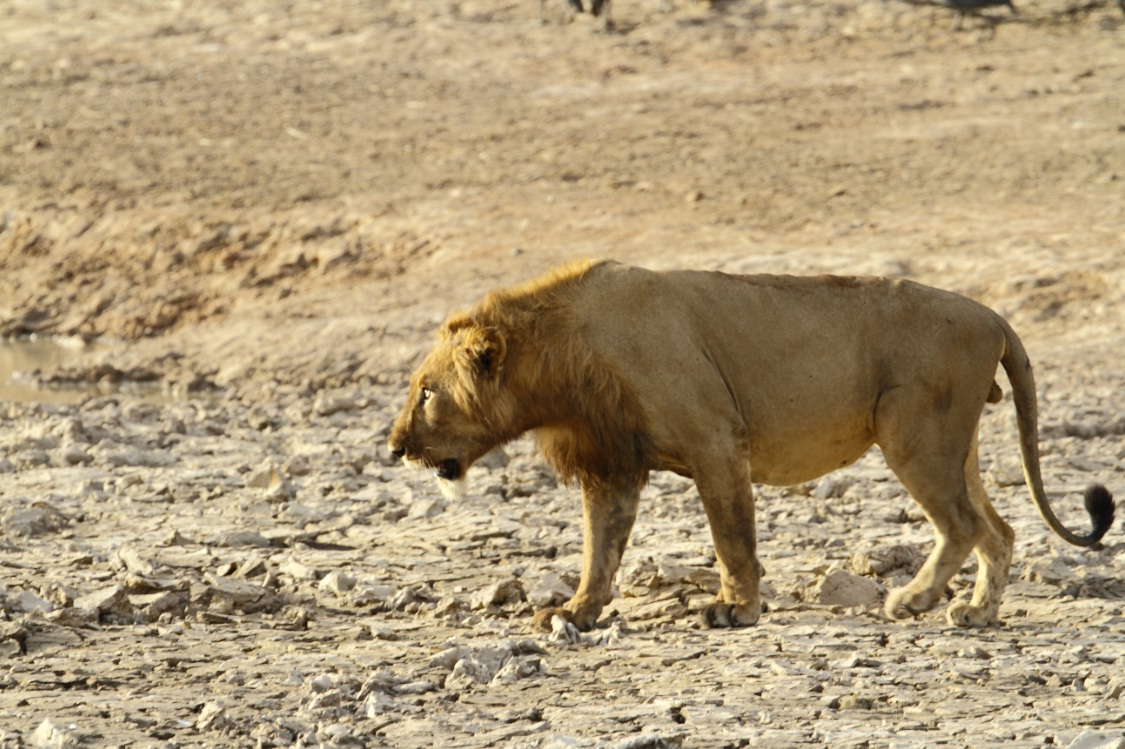
Lion

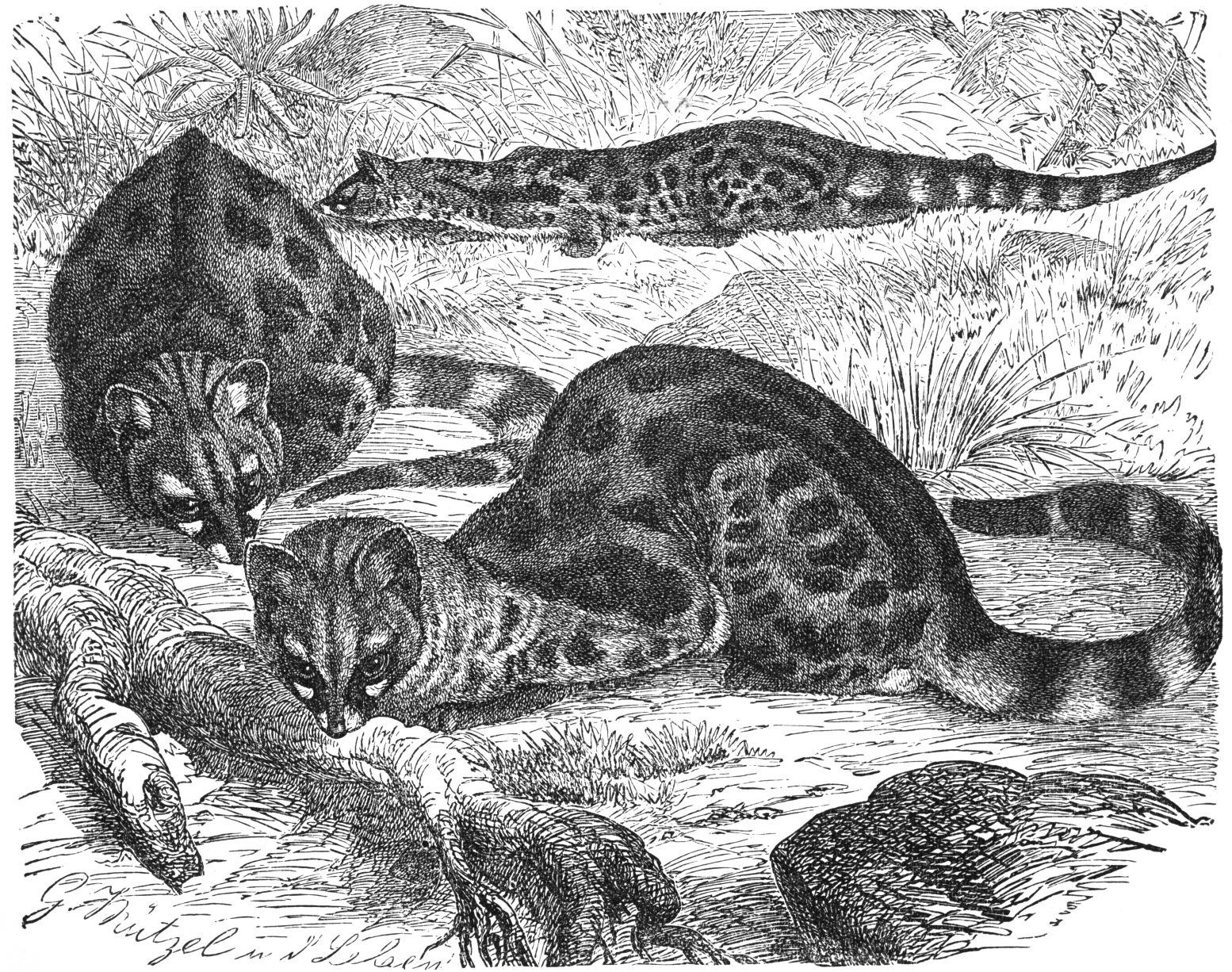
Common genet

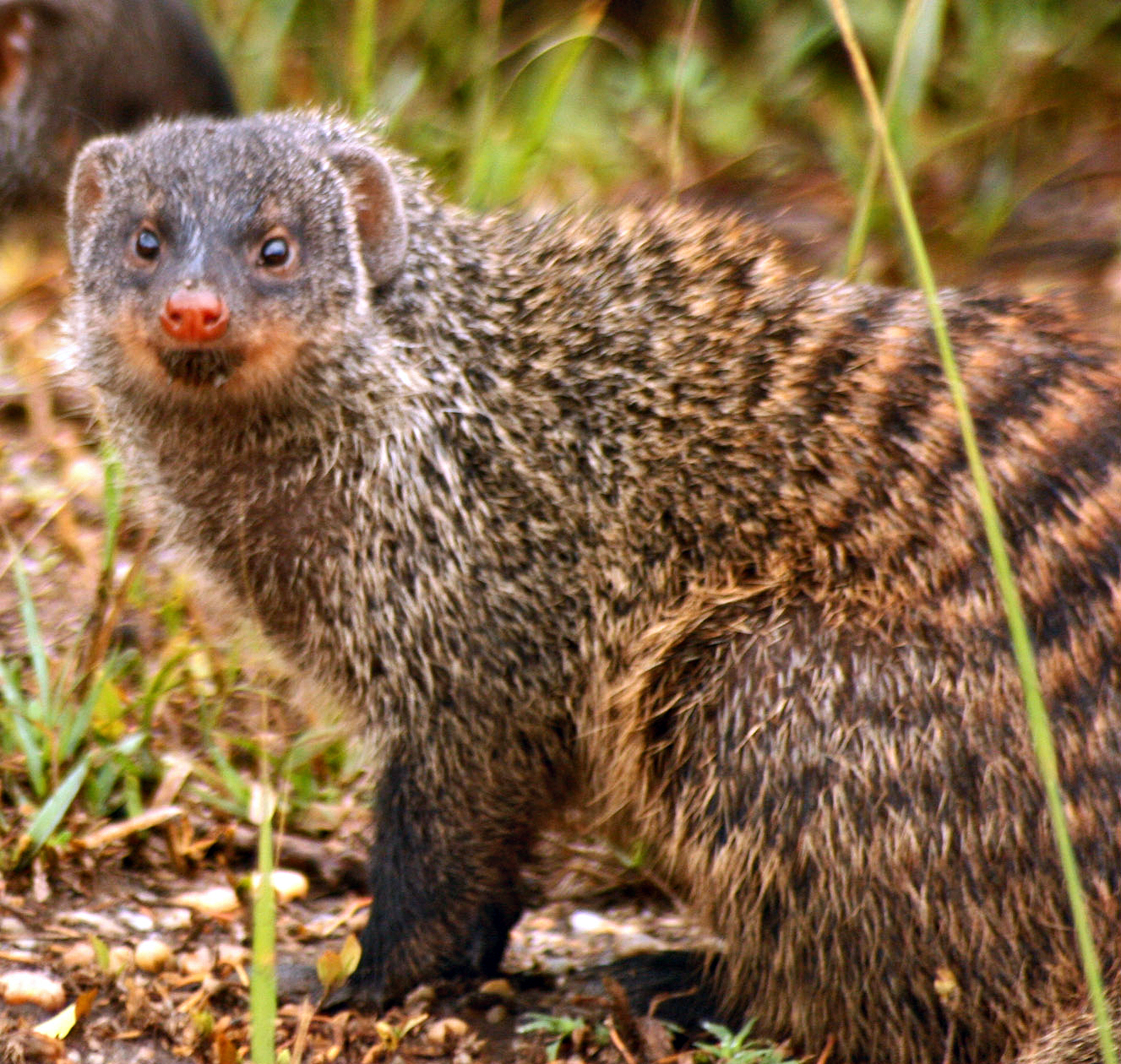
Banded mongoose

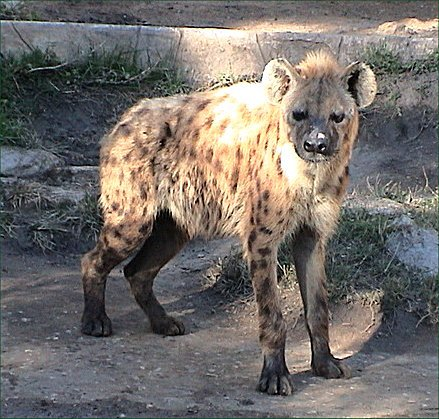
Spotted hyena

There are over 260 species of carnivorans, the majority of which feed primarily on meat. They have a characteristic skull shape and dentition.

- Suborder: Feliformia
  - Family: Felidae (cats)
    - Subfamily: Felinae
      - Genus: Caracal
        - African golden cat, C. aurata VU presence uncertain
        - Caracal, C. caracal LC
      - Genus: Felis
        - African wildcat, F. lybica LC
      - Genus: Leptailurus
        - Serval, Leptailurus serval LC
    - Subfamily: Pantherinae
      - Genus: Panthera
        - Lion, Panthera leo VU
        - Leopard, Panthera pardus VU
  - Family: Viverridae
    - Subfamily: Viverrinae
      - Genus: Civettictis
        - African civet, Civettictis civetta LC
      - Genus: Genetta
        - Common genet, Genetta genetta LC
        - Rusty-spotted genet, Genetta maculata LC
        - Hausa genet, Genetta thierryi LC
  - Family: Nandiniidae
    - Genus: Nandinia
      - African palm civet, Nandinia binotata LC
  - Family: Herpestidae (mongooses)
    - Genus: Atilax
      - Marsh mongoose, Atilax paludinosus LC
    - Genus: Herpestes
      - Egyptian mongoose, Herpestes ichneumon LC
      - Common slender mongoose, Herpestes sanguineus LC
    - Genus: Ichneumia
      - White-tailed mongoose, Ichneumia albicauda LC
    - Genus: Mungos
      - Gambian mongoose, Mungos gambianus DD
      - Banded mongoose, Mungos mungo LC
  - Family: Hyaenidae (hyaenas)
    - Genus: Crocuta
      - Spotted hyena, Crocuta crocuta LC
    - Genus: Hyaena
      - Striped hyena, Hyaena hyaena NT
- Suborder: Caniformia
  - Family: Canidae (dogs, foxes)
    - Genus: Vulpes
      - Pale fox, Vulpes pallida DD
    - Genus: Canis
      - African golden wolf, Canis lupaster LC
    - Genus: Lupulella
      - Side-striped jackal, L. adusta LC
    - Genus: Lycaon
      - African wild dog, Lycaon pictus EN
  - Family: Mustelidae (mustelids)
    - Genus: Ictonyx
      - Striped polecat, Ictonyx striatus LC
    - Genus: Mellivora
      - Honey badger, Mellivora capensis LC
    - Genus: Aonyx
      - African clawless otter, Aonyx capensis LC
  - Family: Phocidae (earless seals)
    - Genus: Monachus
      - Mediterranean monk seal, M. monachus EN extirpated

== Order: Perissodactyla (odd-toed ungulates) ==
The odd-toed ungulates are browsing and grazing mammals. They are usually large to very large, and have relatively simple stomachs and a large middle toe.

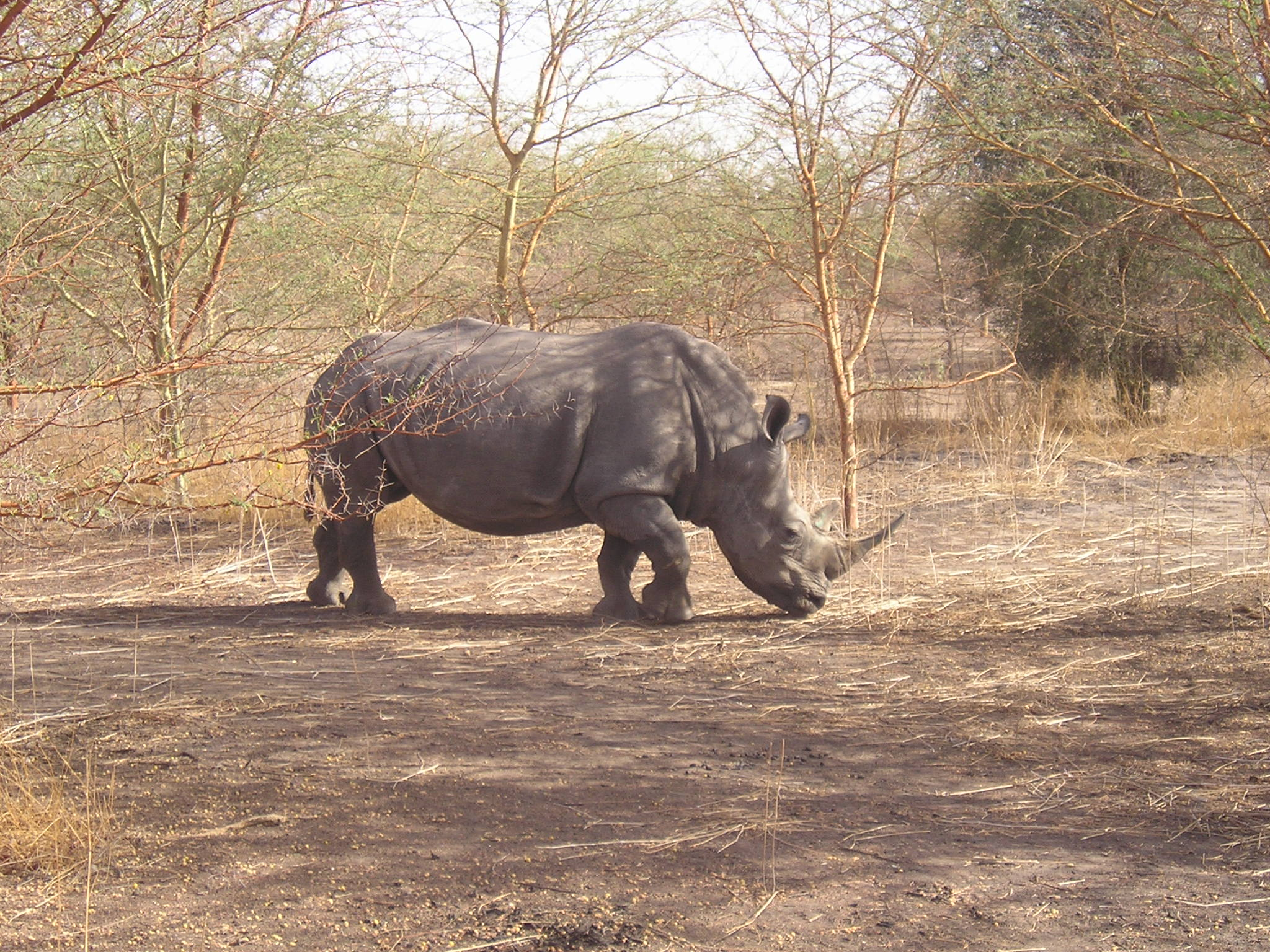
White rhinoceros at Bandia Nature Reserve

- Family: Equidae (horses etc.)
  - Genus: Equus
    - Plains zebra, E. quagga NT introduced
- Family: Rhinocerotidae
  - Genus: Ceratotherium
    - White rhinoceros, C. simum NT introduced

== Order: Artiodactyla (even-toed ungulates) ==
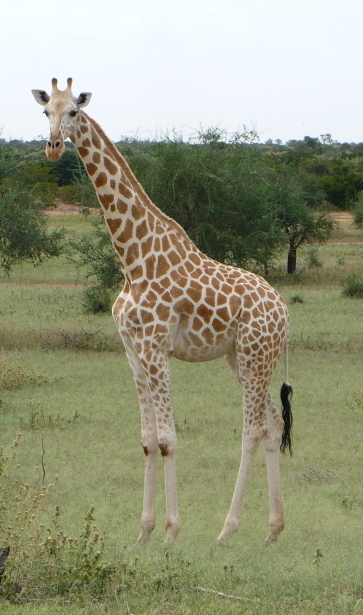
West African giraffe

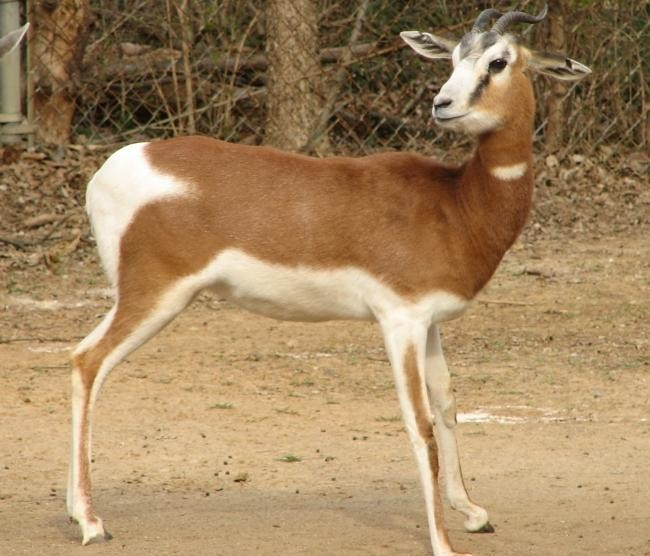
Dama gazelle

]

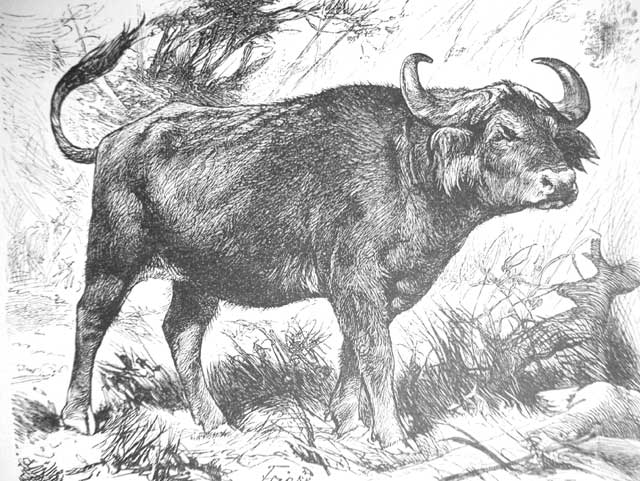
African buffalo

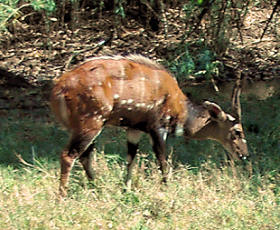
Bushbuck

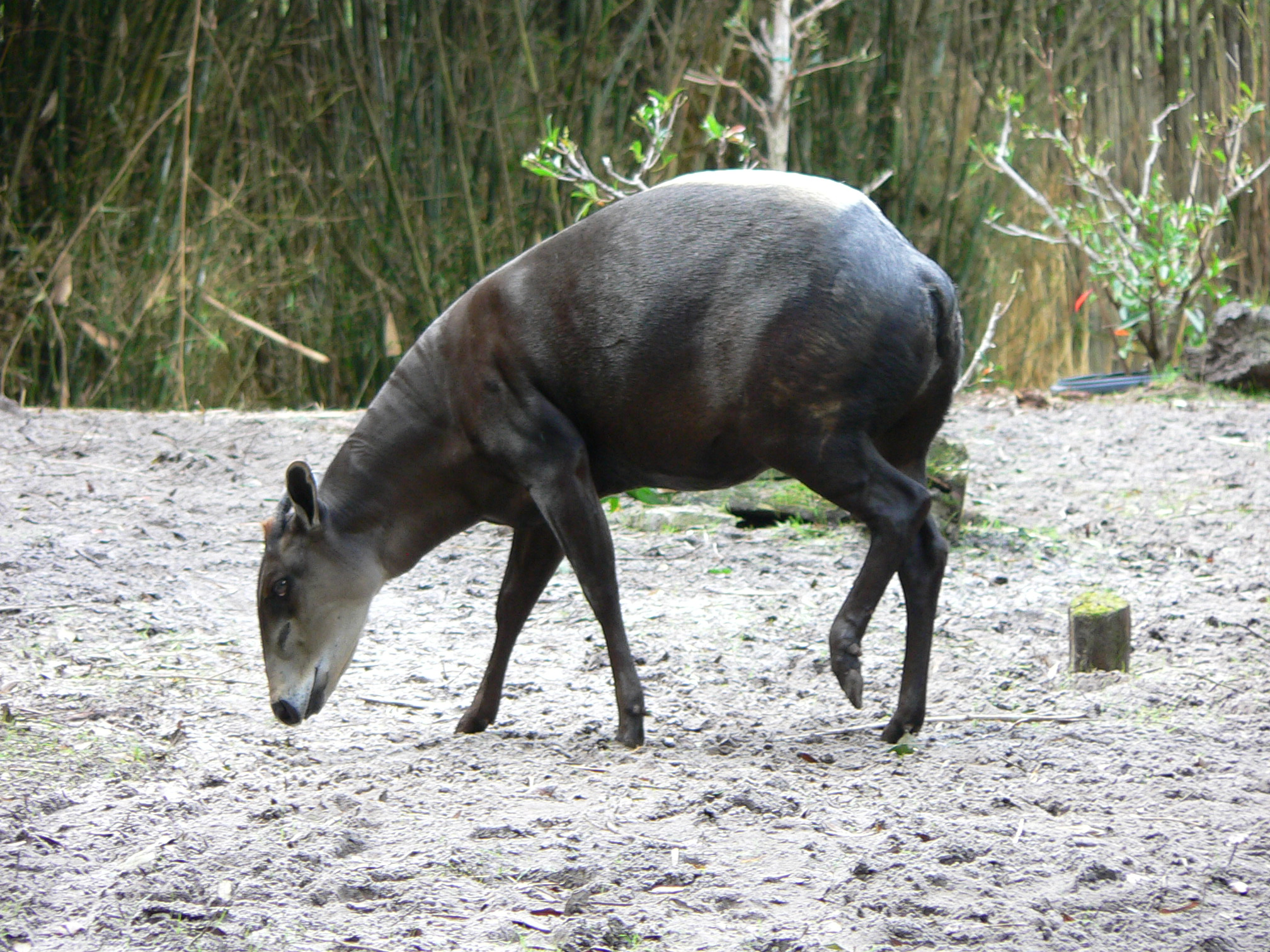
Yellow-backed duiker

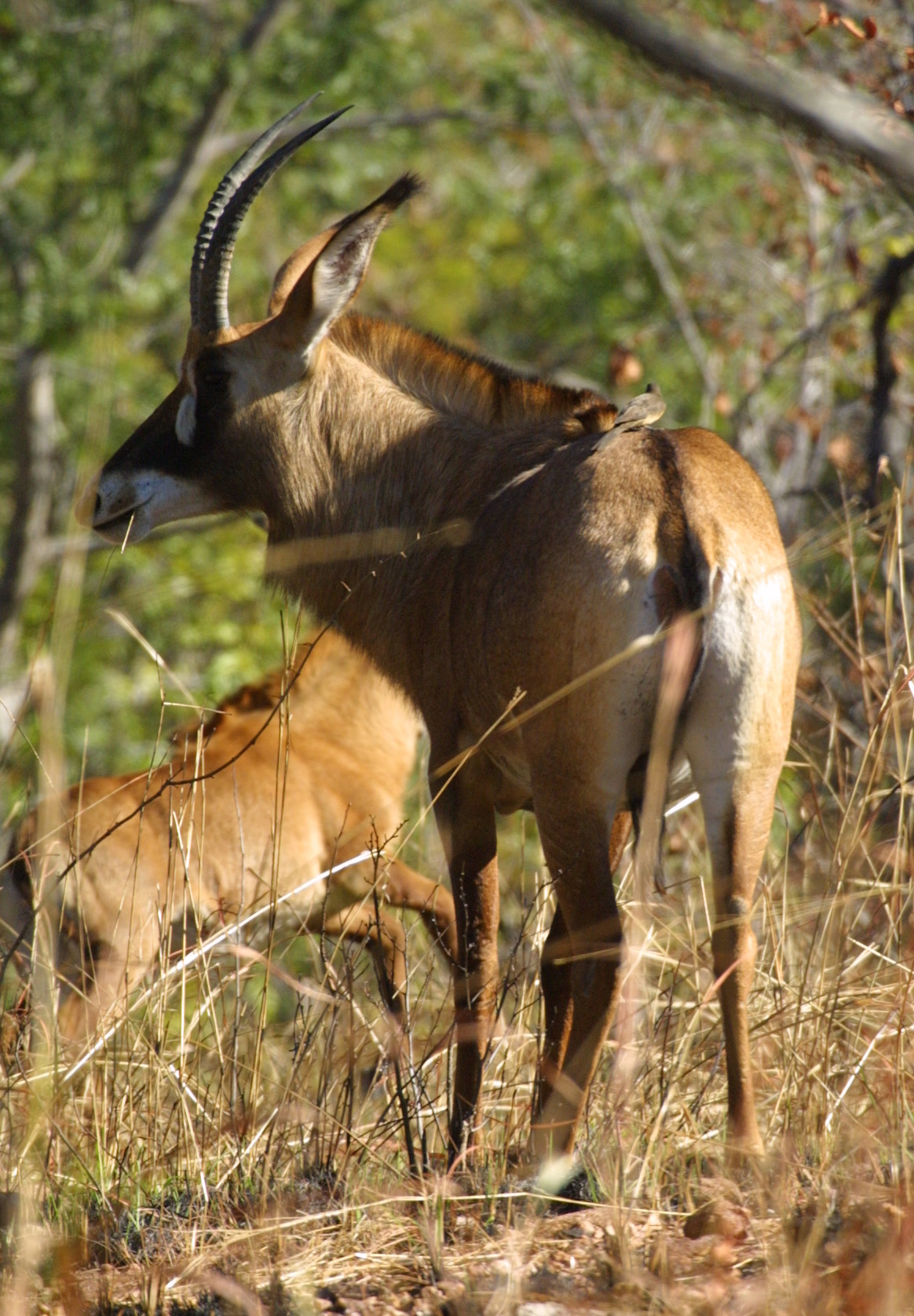
Roan antelope

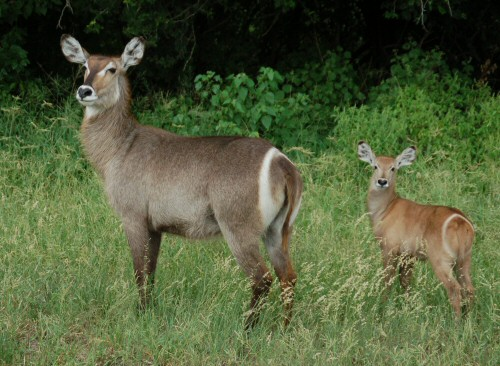
Waterbuck

The even-toed ungulates are ungulates whose weight is borne about equally by the third and fourth toes, rather than mostly or entirely by the third as in perissodactyls. There are about 220 artiodactyl species, including many that are of great economic importance to humans.

- Family: Suidae (pigs)
  - Subfamily: Phacochoerinae
    - Genus: Phacochoerus
      - Common warthog, Phacochoerus africanus LC
  - Subfamily: Suinae
    - Genus: Potamochoerus
      - Red river hog, Potamochoerus porcus LC
- Family: Hippopotamidae (hippopotamuses)
  - Genus: Hippopotamus
    - Hippopotamus, Hippopotamus amphibius VU
- Family: Tragulidae
  - Genus: Hyemoschus
    - Water chevrotain, Hyemoschus aquaticus DD
- Family: Giraffidae (giraffe, okapi)
  - Genus: Giraffa
    - Giraffe, Giraffa camelopardalis VU extirpated
- Family: Bovidae (cattle, antelope, sheep, goats)
  - Subfamily: Alcelaphinae
    - Genus: Alcelaphus
      - Hartebeest, Alcelaphus buselaphus LC
    - Genus: Damaliscus
      - Topi, Damaliscus lunatus LC
  - Subfamily: Antilopinae
    - Genus: Gazella
      - Dorcas gazelle, Gazella dorcas VU reintroduced
      - Red-fronted gazelle, Gazella rufifrons VU
    - Genus: Nanger
      - Dama gazelle, Nanger dama CR extirpated
    - Genus: Ourebia
      - Oribi, Ourebia ourebi LC
  - Subfamily: Bovinae
    - Genus: Syncerus
      - African buffalo, Syncerus caffer LC
    - Genus: Tragelaphus
      - Giant eland, Tragelaphus derbianus LR/nt
      - Bushbuck, Tragelaphus scriptus LR/lc
      - Sitatunga, Tragelaphus spekii LR/nt
  - Subfamily: Cephalophinae
    - Genus: Cephalophus
      - Maxwell's duiker, Cephalophus maxwellii LR/nt
      - Red-flanked duiker, Cephalophus rufilatus LR/cd
      - Yellow-backed duiker, Cephalophus silvicultor LR/nt
    - Genus: Sylvicapra
      - Common duiker, Sylvicapra grimmia LC
  - Subfamily: Hippotraginae
    - Genus: Hippotragus
      - Roan antelope, Hippotragus equinus LC
    - Genus: Oryx
      - Scimitar oryx, Oryx dammah EW
  - Subfamily: Aepycerotinae
    - Genus: Aepyceros
      - Impala, A. melampus LC introduced
  - Subfamily: Reduncinae
    - Genus: Kobus
      - Waterbuck, Kobus ellipsiprymnus LC
      - Kob, Kobus kob LC
    - Genus: Redunca
      - Bohor reedbuck, Redunca redunca LC

== See also ==
- List of chordate orders
- Lists of mammals by region
- Mammal classification
- List of mammals described in the 2000s
