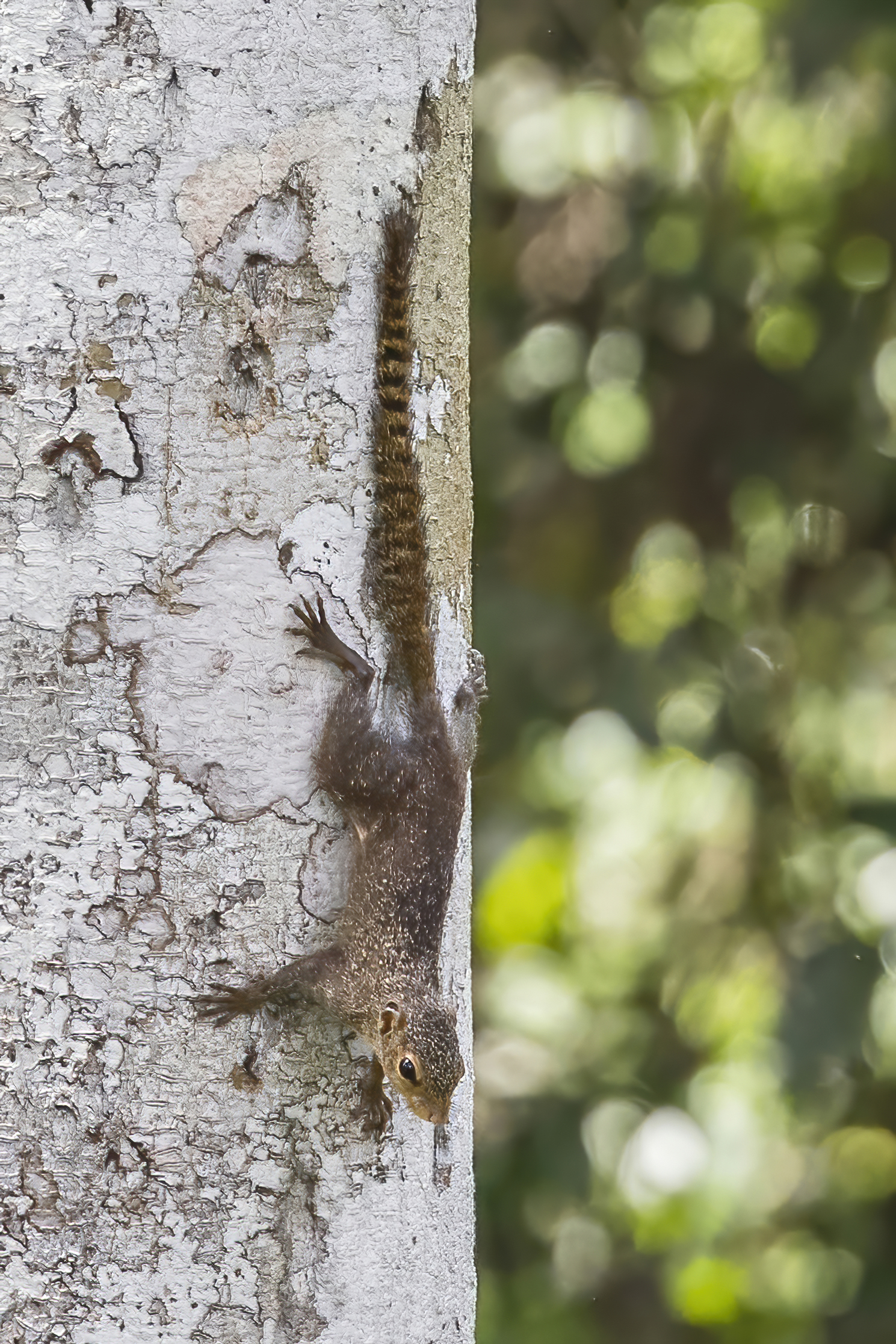
- Kakum National Park, Ghana

Conservation status
- Data Deficient (IUCN 3.1)

Scientific classification
- Kingdom: Animalia
- Phylum: Chordata
- Class: Mammalia
- Order: Rodentia
- Family: Sciuridae
- Genus: Heliosciurus
- Species: H. punctatus

Binomial name
- Heliosciurus punctatus (Temminck, 1853)

Subspecies
- Heliosciurus punctatus punctatus; Heliosciurus punctatus savannius

= Small sun squirrel =

Species of rodent

The small sun squirrel (Heliosciurus punctatus) is a species of rodent in the family Sciuridae. It is found in Ivory Coast, Ghana, Liberia, Sierra Leone, and possibly Guinea. Its natural habitat is subtropical or tropical moist lowland forests.
