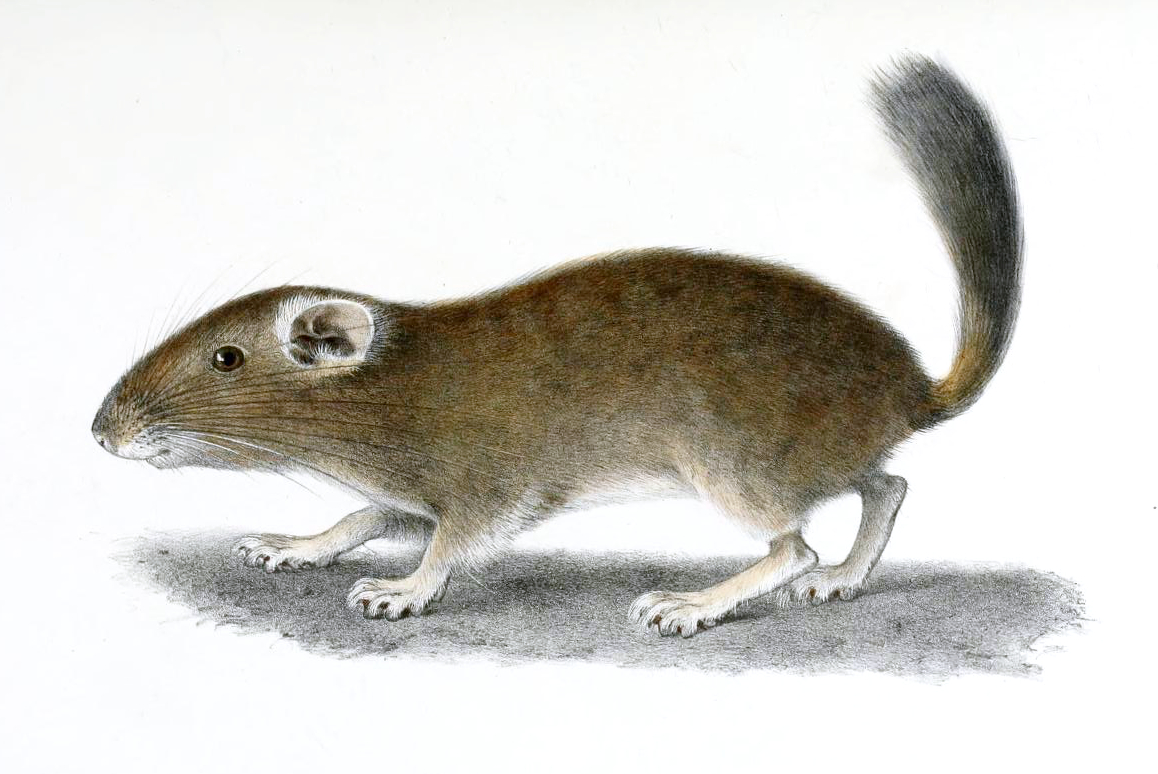

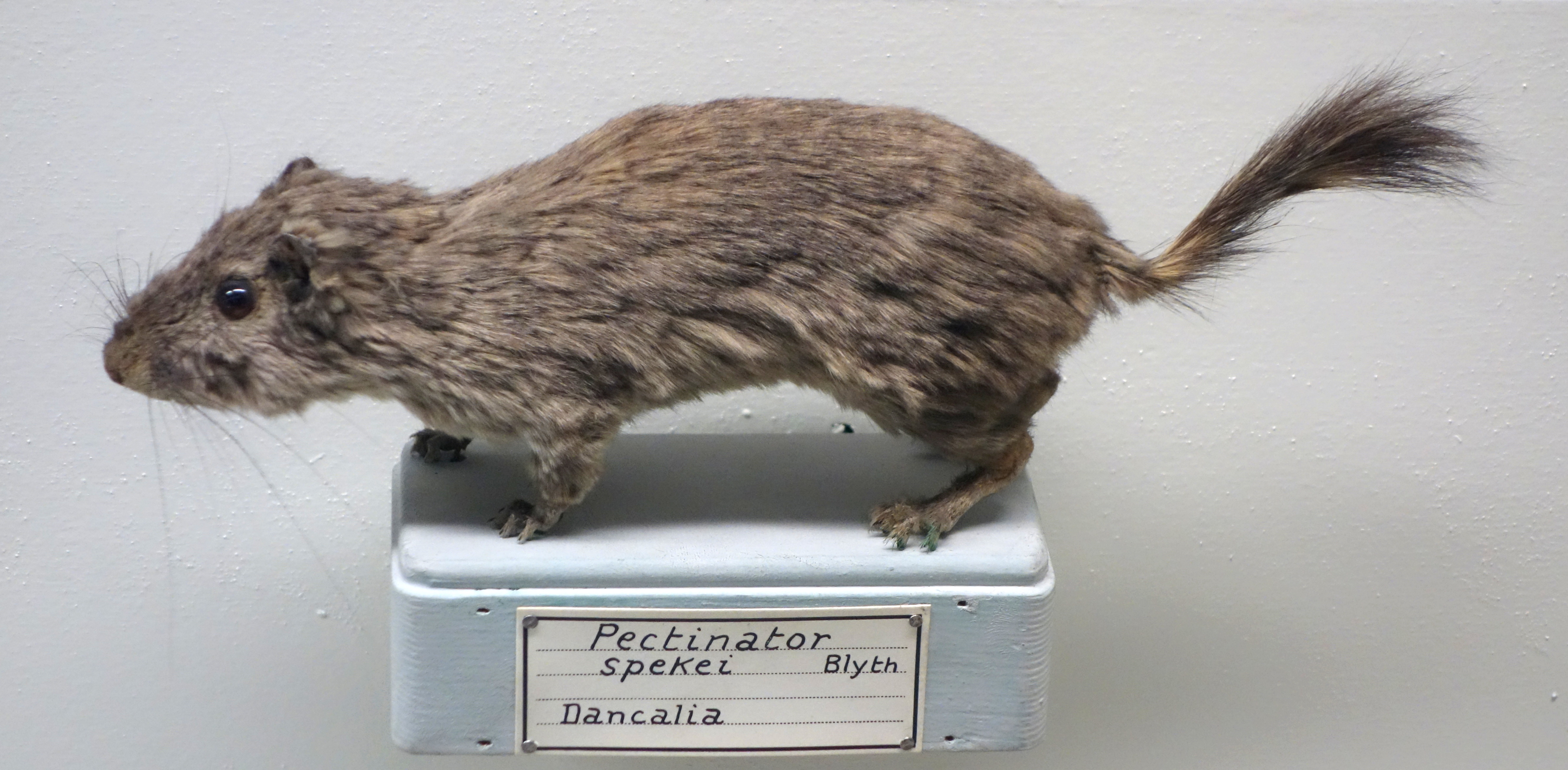

Conservation status
- Least Concern (IUCN 3.1)

Scientific classification
- Kingdom: Animalia
- Phylum: Chordata
- Class: Mammalia
- Order: Rodentia
- Family: Ctenodactylidae
- Genus: Pectinator; Blyth, 1856
- Species: P. spekei

Binomial name
- Pectinator spekei Blyth, 1856
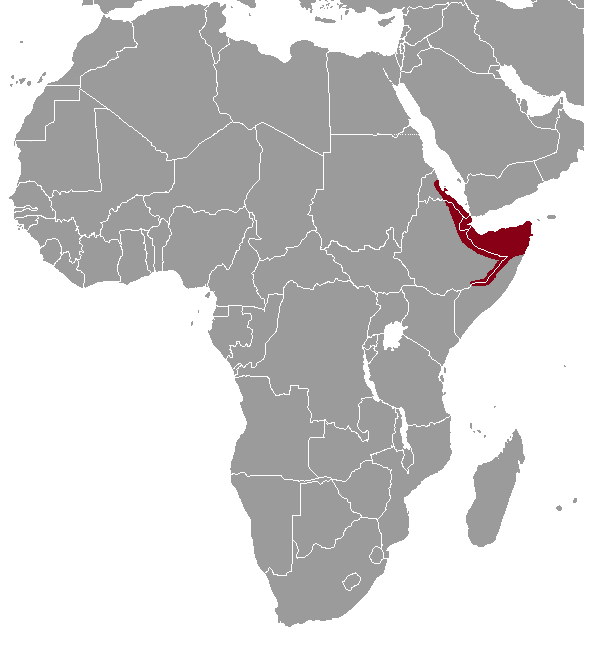
- distribution

= Speke's pectinator =

Speke's pectinator Temporal range: Early Pliocene?, Recent

Species of rodent

Speke's pectinator (Pectinator spekei) or Speke's gundi, is a species of rodent in the family Ctenodactylidae. It is monotypic within the genus Pectinator. It is found in Djibouti, Eritrea, Ethiopia, and Somalia. Its natural habitats are subtropical or tropical dry shrubland, subtropical or tropical dry lowland grassland, and rocky areas.

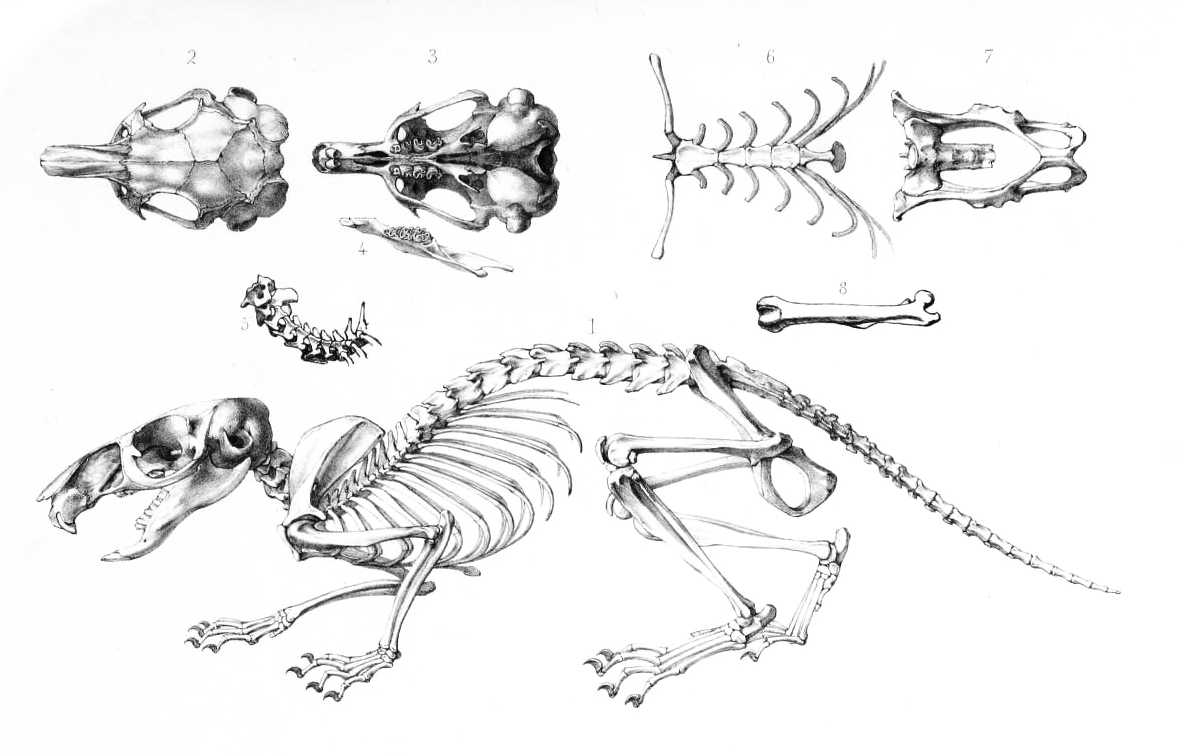
Skeletal details * 1 Skeleton * 2 Skull from above * 3 Skull from below * 4 Left side of lower jaw * 5 Cervical and part of the thoracic portion of the vertebral column * 6 Sternum, episternum, clavicles, and costal cartilages * 7 Pelvis * 8 Femur
