= Fernand Lataste =

French zoologist (1847–1934)

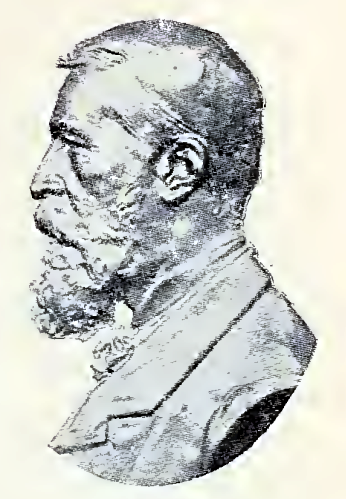
Fernand Lataste

Fernand Lataste (1847–1934) was a French zoologist and herpetologist born in Cadillac, Gironde.

From 1880 to 1884, he collected reptiles and amphibians in North Africa (Algeria, Tunisia and Morocco), publishing "Les missions scientifiques de Fernand Lataste en Afrique noire et au Maghreb". In 1885, he released "Étude de la faune des vertébrés de Barbarie", a standard work on animals of North Africa. Other publications by Lataste are:

- Essai d'une faune herpétologique de la Gironde, 1876 – Essay on the herpetological fauna of Gironde.
- Étude sur le discoglosse, 1879 – Study of Discoglossus.
- Notes prises au jour le jour sur différentes espèces de l'ordre des rongeurs observées en captivité, 1886. – Notes taken on a daily basis involving different species of rodents observed in captivity.
- Liste de mollusques du Chili : lettre à M. Fernand Lataste, 1896 – List of mollusks native to Chile.

In 1876 he was a founding member of the Société zoologique de France.

== Taxonomy ==
Lataste was the taxonomic author of numerous genera and species, as an example, in 1880 he described the fat-tailed gerbil (Pachyuromys duprasi).

== Honors ==
Lataste's work was recognized by multiple species named in his honor, including the following:

- Lataste's gerbil (Gerbillus latastei)
- Lataste's gundi, often referred to as the Mzab gundi, (Massoutiera mzabi)
- Lataste's snake skink (Ophiomorus latastii)
- Lataste's lizard (Timon pater)
- Pontian Wall Lizard (Podarcis latastei)
- Lataste's viper (Vipera latastei)
- Latastia, a genus of lacertid lizards;
- Lataste's frog (Rana latastei) which inhabits the plains of Northern Italy, the southern tip of Switzerland, Slovenia and Croatia.
