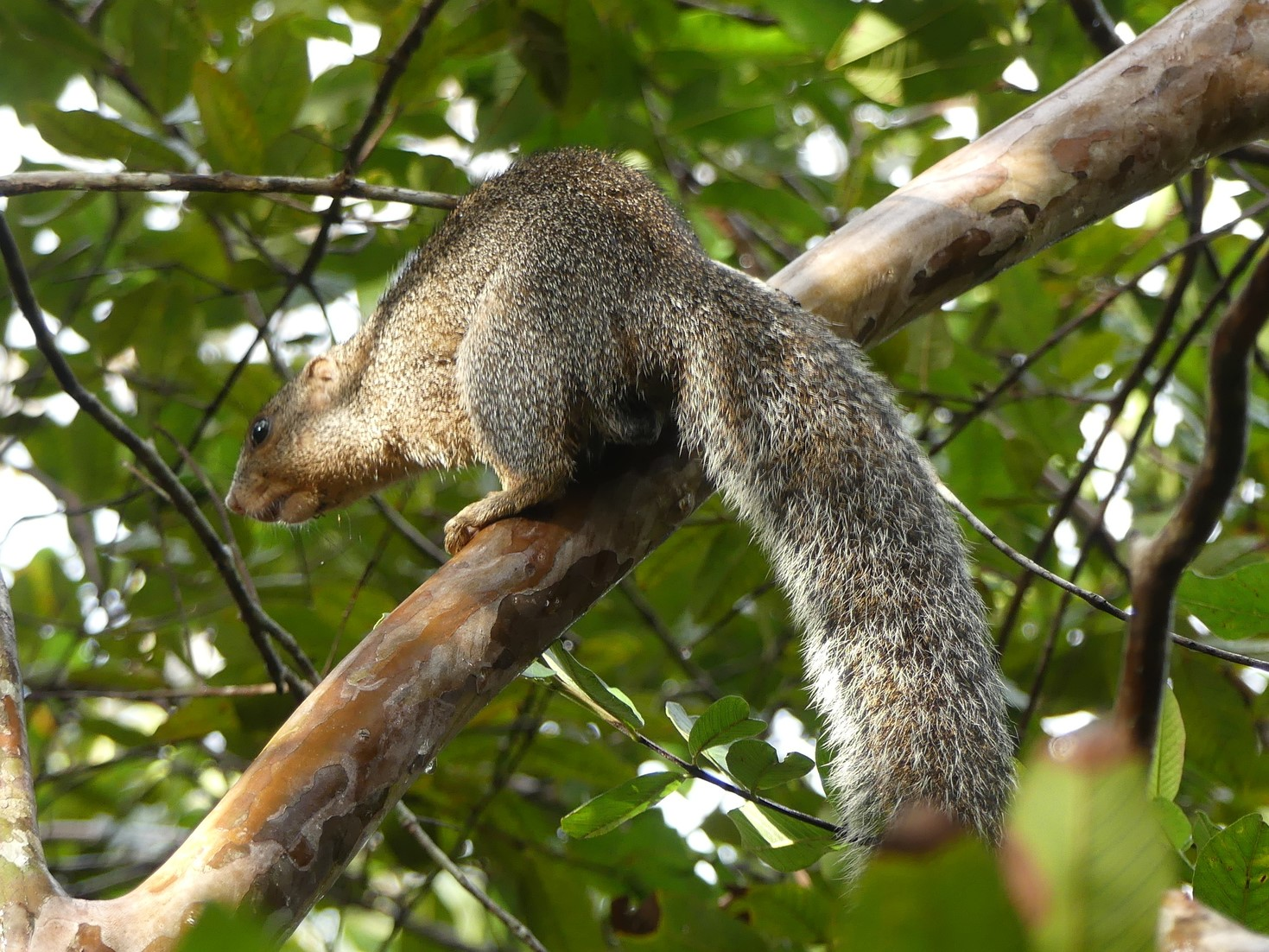

Conservation status
- Data Deficient (IUCN 3.1)

Scientific classification
- Kingdom: Animalia
- Phylum: Chordata
- Class: Mammalia
- Order: Rodentia
- Family: Sciuridae
- Genus: Heliosciurus
- Species: H. undulatus

Binomial name
- Heliosciurus undulatus (F. W. True, 1892)

= Zanj sun squirrel =

Species of rodent

The Zanj sun squirrel (Heliosciurus undulatus) is a species of rodent in the family Sciuridae found in eastern Africa.

== Description ==
The Zanj sun squirrel is a large squirrel with a greyish tawny body and a long ringed tail. The fur on the upper part of the body, including the tail is tawny grey grizzled with grey bands, each hair ending in a white subterminal band. The underside is whitish or pale rufous. The head has a similar color to the dorsal fur but with rufous tints. The tail is long, 20% longer than the head and body, and is slender marked with 10-14 black bands which alternate with pale bands. There is geographical variation throughout its range with the animals found inland at higher elevations being the darkest and richest in colour while those from the north of its range are paler while the southerly populations are duller and greyer. The mean head and body length is 233 mm (9.2 in) and the mean tail length is 281 mm (11.1 in).

== Distribution and habitat ==
The Zanj sun squirrel is found in south-eastern Kenya and north-eastern Tanzania, including the islands of Mafia and Unguja, the main island of Zanzibar, but not on Pemba.

The Zanj sun squirrel has mostly been recorded from coastal forests and riverine gallery forest but has also been recorded below 2,000 m (6,600 ft) above sea level on Mount Kilimanjaro.

== Biology ==
Little is known about the biology of the Zanj sun squirrel but it is omnivorous eating fruits, leaves, seeds, buds and palm dates. Insects are important when in season.

== Conservation status ==
The coastal forests inhabited by Zanj sun squirrels are under threat from clearance for expanding agriculture, charcoal burning and fuel wood extraction, uncontrolled fires, unsustainable logging, human settlement, and destructive mining practices. It is unknown how these factors have affected this species so the IUCN give the status as Data Deficient. It occurs in several protected areas, including Arabuko Sokoke National Park and Jozani Chwaka Bay National Park on Unguja South Region of Tanzania.
