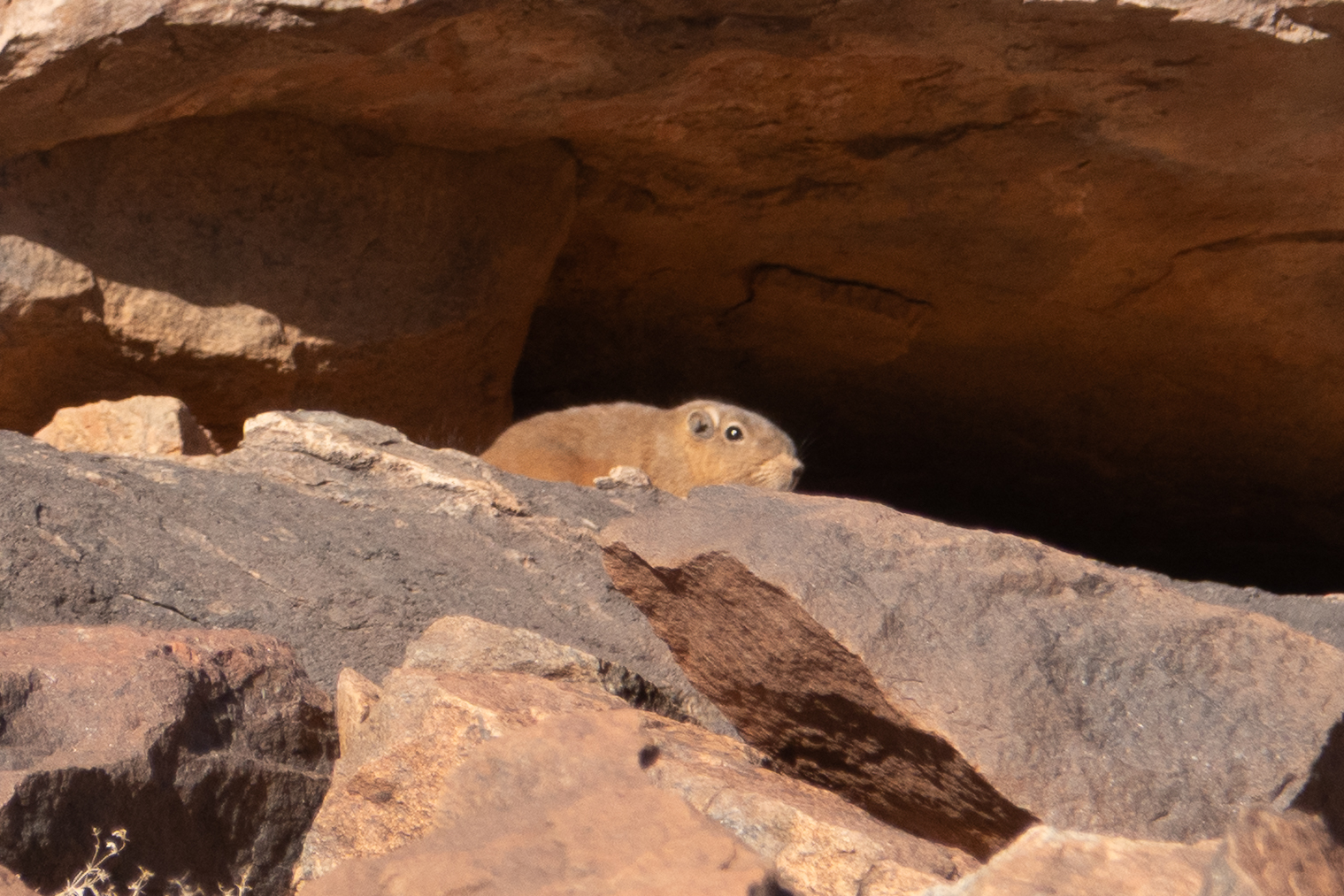

Conservation status
- Least Concern (IUCN 3.1)

Scientific classification
- Kingdom: Animalia
- Phylum: Chordata
- Class: Mammalia
- Order: Rodentia
- Family: Ctenodactylidae
- Genus: Felovia; Lataste, 1886
- Species: F. vae

Binomial name
- Felovia vae Lastaste, 1886
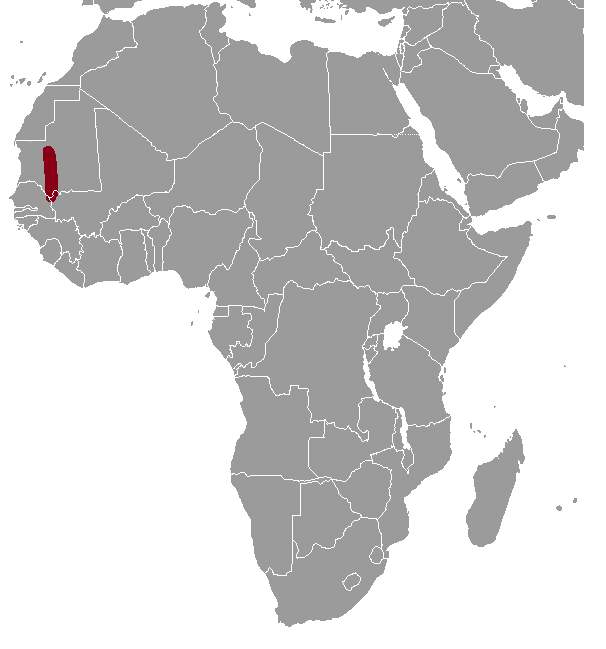
- distribution

= Felou gundi =

Species of rodent

The felou gundi (Felovia vae) is a species of rodent in the family Ctenodactylidae. It is monotypic within the genus Felovia.

== Distribution ==
It is found in Mali, Mauritania, and Senegal.

== Habitat ==
Its natural habitats are dry savanna, subtropical or tropical dry shrubland, subtropical or tropical dry lowland grassland, and rocky areas.
