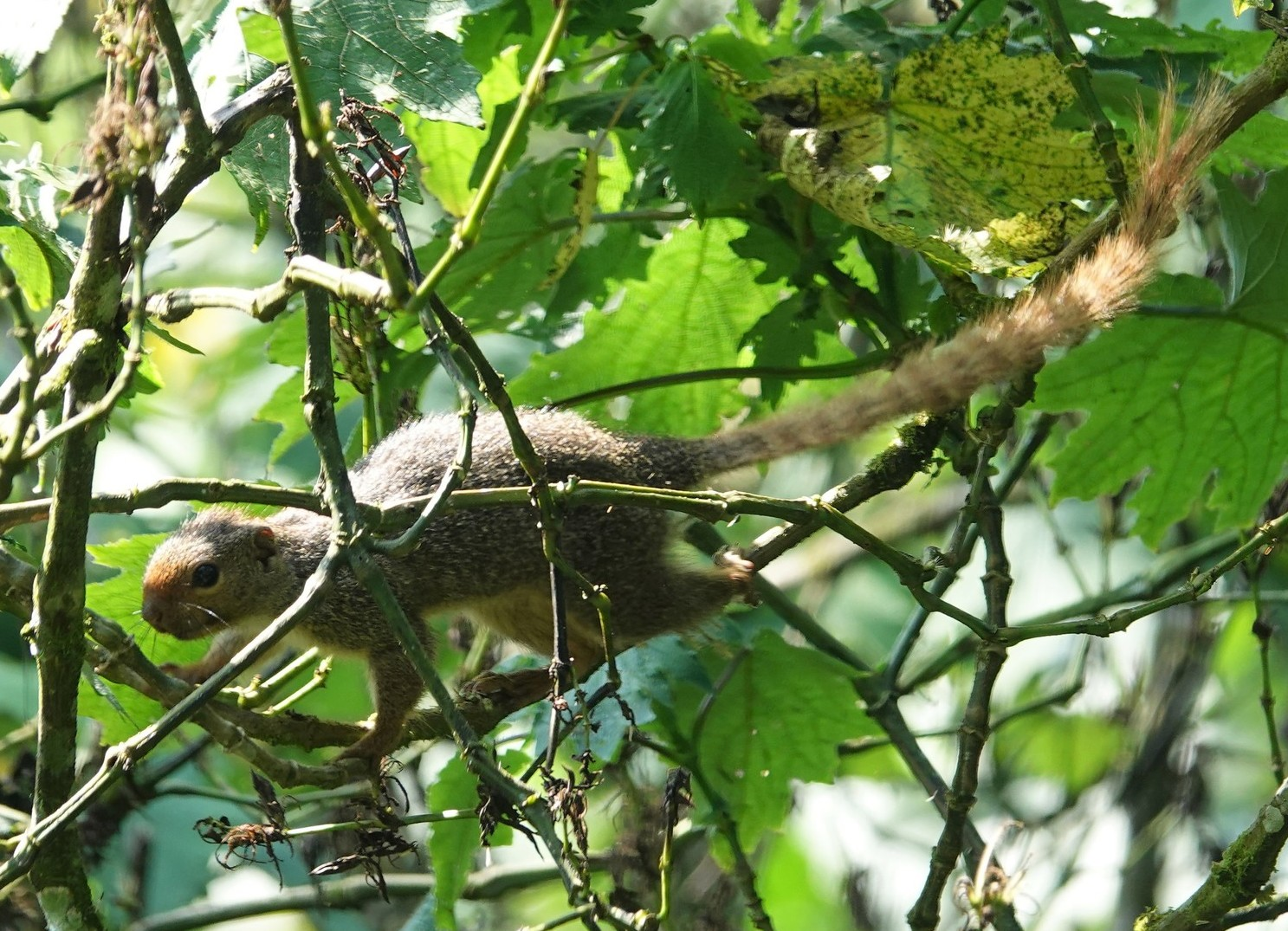

Conservation status
- Least Concern (IUCN 3.1)

Scientific classification
- Kingdom: Animalia
- Phylum: Chordata
- Class: Mammalia
- Order: Rodentia
- Family: Sciuridae
- Genus: Heliosciurus
- Species: H. ruwenzorii

Binomial name
- Heliosciurus ruwenzorii (Schwann, 1904)

Subspecies
- H. r. ruwenzorii; H. r. ituriensis; H. r. schoutedeni; H. r. vulcanius

= Ruwenzori sun squirrel =

Species of rodent

The Ruwenzori sun squirrel (Heliosciurus ruwenzorii) is a species of rodent in the family Sciuridae.

It is found in Burundi, Democratic Republic of the Congo, Rwanda, and Uganda.

Its natural habitats are subtropical or tropical moist montane forests and arable land.
