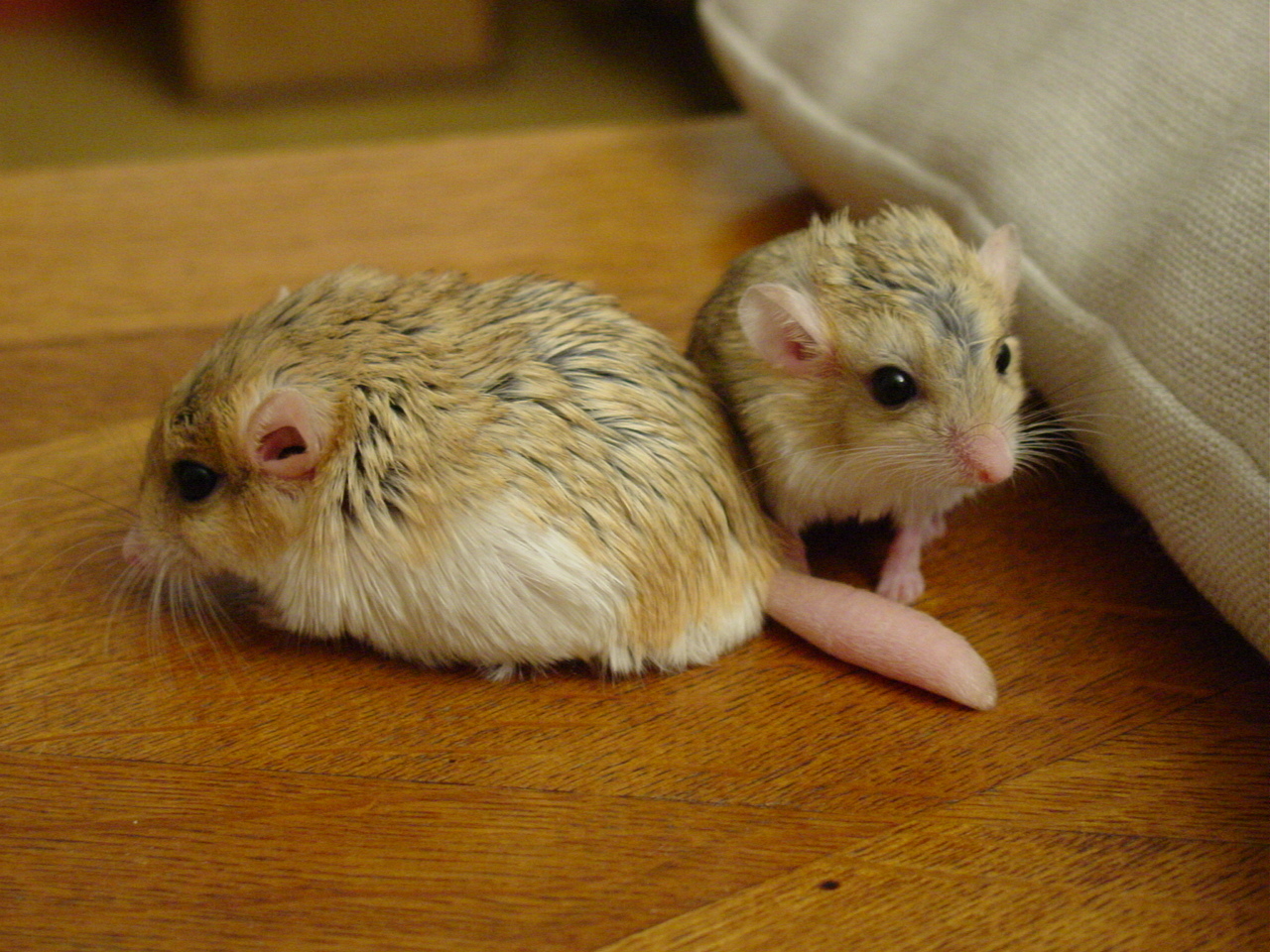
- A pair of duprasi gerbils

Conservation status
- Least Concern (IUCN 3.1)

Scientific classification
- Kingdom: Animalia
- Phylum: Chordata
- Class: Mammalia
- Order: Rodentia
- Family: Muridae
- Genus: Pachyuromys; Lataste, 1880
- Species: P. duprasi

Binomial name
- Pachyuromys duprasi Lataste, 1880

= Fat-tailed gerbil =

Species of rodent

The fat-tailed gerbil (Pachyuromys duprasi), also called the duprasi gerbil or doop, is a rodent belonging to the subfamily Gerbillinae. It is the only species in the genus Pachyuromys. They are frequently kept as pets.

Other common English names are: fat-tailed jird, fat-tailed rat, and beer mat gerbil.

== Description ==
The fat-tailed gerbil is a medium-sized gerbil. Its body length is about 10 cm (3.9 in), with a tail length of about 5 cm (2.0 in). The hair at the back and the head is yellow-coloured, with a dark grey base and a small black tip. The belly is white. Fat-tailed gerbils weigh between 22 and 45 grams (0.78 and 1.59 oz) in the wild, but in captivity can weigh between 55 and 82 grams (1.9 and 2.9 oz). Their body is round and somewhat flattened. They have no clear neck and a very sharp face, with large oval-shaped black eyes. They look similar to a dwarf hamster, but unlike a hamster they have a pointed snout and a fat, almost bald, club-shaped tail. The fat-tailed gerbil stores fat in its tail in the same way that the camel stores fat in its hump.

Captive specimens of the fat-tailed gerbil have an average life span of between 2 and 4 years.

== Distribution ==
The French zoologist Fernand Lataste first described P. duprasi in 1880 in Laghouat, Algeria in Le Naturaliste.

Fat-tailed gerbils are native to the Northern Sahara (northwestern Egypt, Libya, Tunisia, and Algeria), where they live in sparsely vegetated sand sheets or rocky deserts. In the wild, fat-tailed gerbils live in simple burrows about one meter deep, in hard sandy soil. They may also occupy other species' burrows.

== Diet ==
Fat-tailed gerbils are mostly insectivorous in the wild, but will eat also a variety of plants. In captivity, they are kept on a basic rodent mix, and are fond of mealworms, crickets, moths, and almost any other insect, even beetles. They can also be given some vegetables and fruit, like carrots, cauliflower, chicory, and apples.

== Behavior ==
Wild fat-tailed gerbils are solitary animals, and sometimes live in colonies. In the wild, fat-tailed gerbils become active at dusk and this is the same in captivity - although they can sometimes appear to be diurnal. Fat-tailed gerbils are generally docile towards humans, but may be aggressive towards other gerbils. When they fight, they shriek loudly and bite each other's tails. The mating ritual of the fat-tailed gerbil may also be confused with fighting.

Fat-tailed gerbils, like most other rodents, have scent glands on their stomach and engage in marking their territory by stretching out and rubbing their bellies on the ground and furnishings.

== Breeding ==
Fat-tailed gerbils sexually mature when they are around two months old, and the gestation period is 19 to 23 days. Their average litter size is three to six, and the pups are weaned at three to four weeks.
