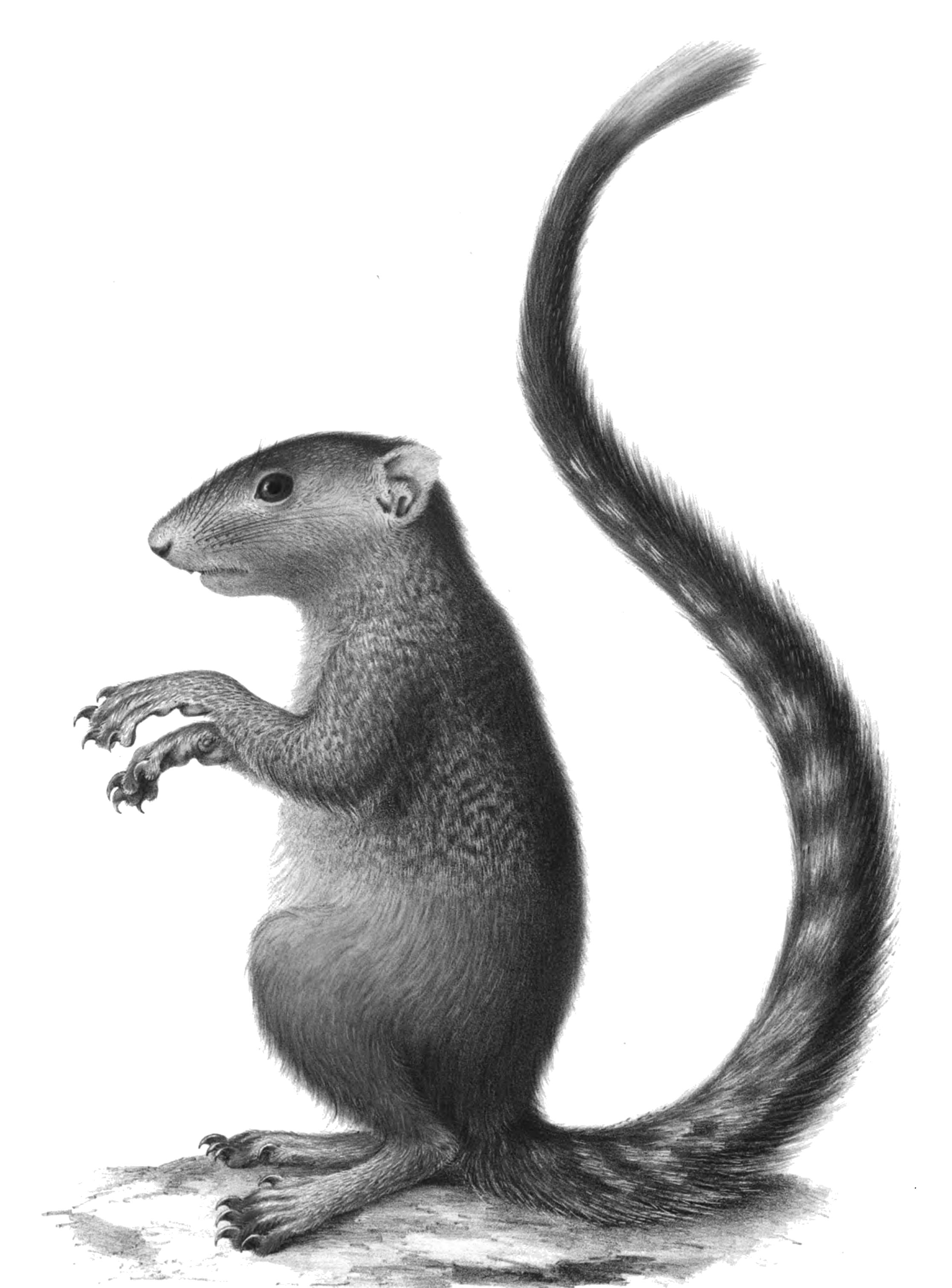

Conservation status
- Least Concern (IUCN 3.1)

Scientific classification
- Kingdom: Animalia
- Phylum: Chordata
- Class: Mammalia
- Order: Rodentia
- Family: Sciuridae
- Genus: Heliosciurus
- Species: H. mutabilis

Binomial name
- Heliosciurus mutabilis (Peters, 1852)

Subspecies
- H. m. mutabilis; H. m. beirae; H. m. chirindensis; H. m. shirensis; H. m. vumbae

= Mutable sun squirrel =

Species of rodent

The mutable sun squirrel (Heliosciurus mutabilis) is a species of rodent in the family Sciuridae. It is found in Malawi, Mozambique, Tanzania, Zambia, and Zimbabwe. Its natural habitats are subtropical or tropical moist lowland forest, subtropical or tropical moist montane forest, moist savanna, and subtropical or tropical high-altitude grassland.
