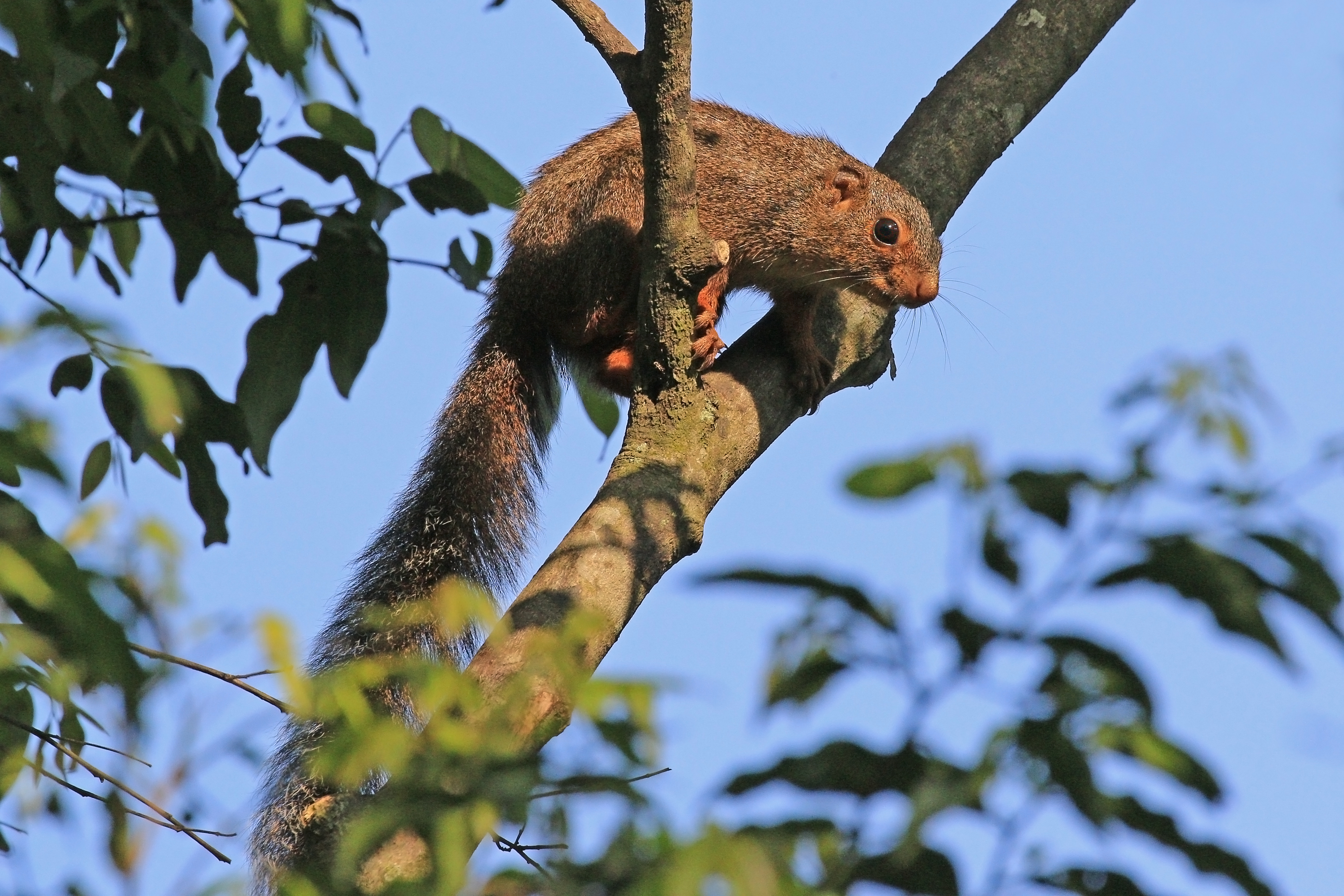

Conservation status
- Least Concern (IUCN 3.1)

Scientific classification
- Kingdom: Animalia
- Phylum: Chordata
- Class: Mammalia
- Order: Rodentia
- Family: Sciuridae
- Genus: Heliosciurus
- Species: H. rufobrachium

Binomial name
- Heliosciurus rufobrachium (Waterhouse, 1842)

Subspecies
- See text

= Red-legged sun squirrel =

Species of rodent

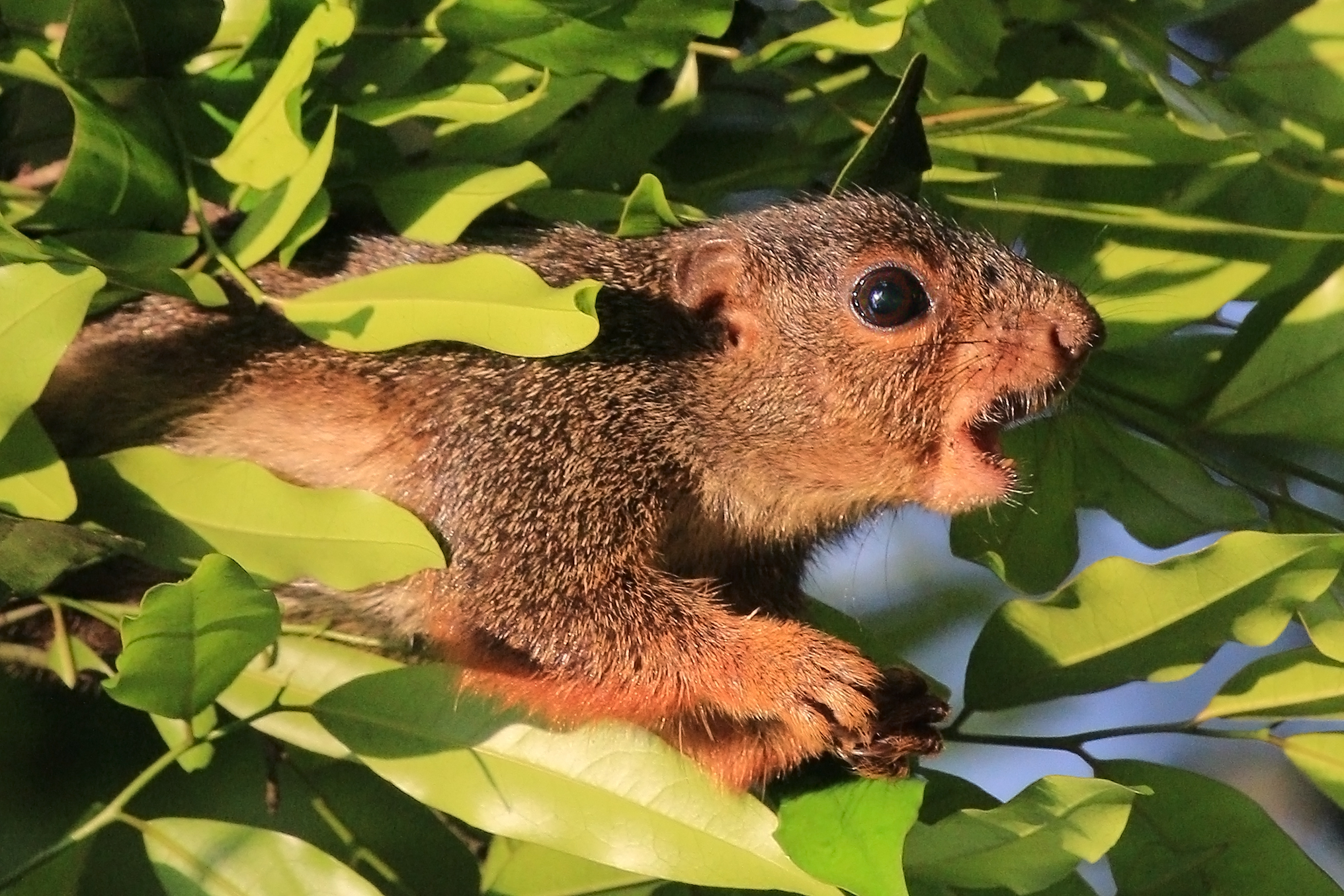
Red-legged sun squirrel in Ishasha, Queen Elizabeth National Park, Uganda

The red-legged sun squirrel (Heliosciurus rufobrachium) is a species of rodent in the family Sciuridae, also commonly known as the isabelline red-legged sun squirrel. It is native to tropical western and central Africa where its range extends from Senegal in the west, through Nigeria and the Republic of Congo to Uganda and Tanzania in the east. Its natural habitats are subtropical or tropical moist lowland forests and moist savanna. This species is thought to be common and has a very wide distribution, so the International Union for Conservation of Nature has rated its conservation status as being of "least concern".

== Description ==
The red-legged sun squirrel is a medium-sized squirrel, with an average head-body length of 24 centimetres (9.4 in) and an average weight of 353 grams (12.5 oz); males are slightly larger than females. They have large eyes, small rounded ears, and a tail about the same length as the head and body combined. The fur is dark brown to grey across the body, but reddish on the limbs and muzzle and black on the tail. Females have two teats on the chest, and another four much further back on the body on the rear part of the abdomen. The brain is slightly smaller than expected, compared with other African squirrels of similar size.

== Distribution and habitat ==
The red-legged sun squirrel is found across sub-Saharan Africa from Senegal and Gambia in the west to Kenya in the east but not south of the Congo River. It is found in habitats with large trees in which it can climb, in moist primary and secondary forests, plantations, isolated trees in savannahs and gardens. It has been reported from mangrove swamps (Avicennia spp.) in Sierra Leone.

There are 21 subspecies currently recognised:

- H. r. rufobrachium - Bioko
- H. r. arrhenii - Rwanda
- H. r. aubryi - Gabon
- H. r. benga - Equatorial Guinea
- H. r. caurinus - Gambia
- H. r. coenosus - western Democratic Republic of the Congo
- H. r. emissus - northern Cameroon
- H. r. hardyi - Côte d'Ivoire
- H. r. isabellinus - Nigeria
- H. r. keniae - western Kenya
- H. r. leakyi - eastern Kenya
- H. r. leonensis - Sierra Leone
- H. r. lualabae - central DRC
- H. r. maculatus - Ghana
- H. r. medjianus - northeastern DRC
- H. r. nyansae - Uganda
- H. r. obfuscatus - southern Nigeria
- H. r. occidentalis - Senegal
- H. r. pasha - northern DRC
- H. r. rubricatus - central-eastern DRC
- H. r. semlikii - eastern DRC

== Ecology ==
The red-legged sun squirrel is diurnal and forages in the upper and middle storeys of large trees. The diet consists primarily of fruits and seeds, but some green vegetation and arthropods are also eaten; much time is spent foraging along branches and probing into crevices for insects and their larvae. In captivity, these squirrels caught and ate birds introduced into their cages, and also ate bird eggs.

These squirrels are usually observed alone or in pairs, but seem to be gregarious as they have been seen grooming each other and resting side by side. Nesting takes place in holes in trunks and branches which are lined by twigs with their green leaves still attached. Breeding takes place twice a year with usually two young being born in each litter.
