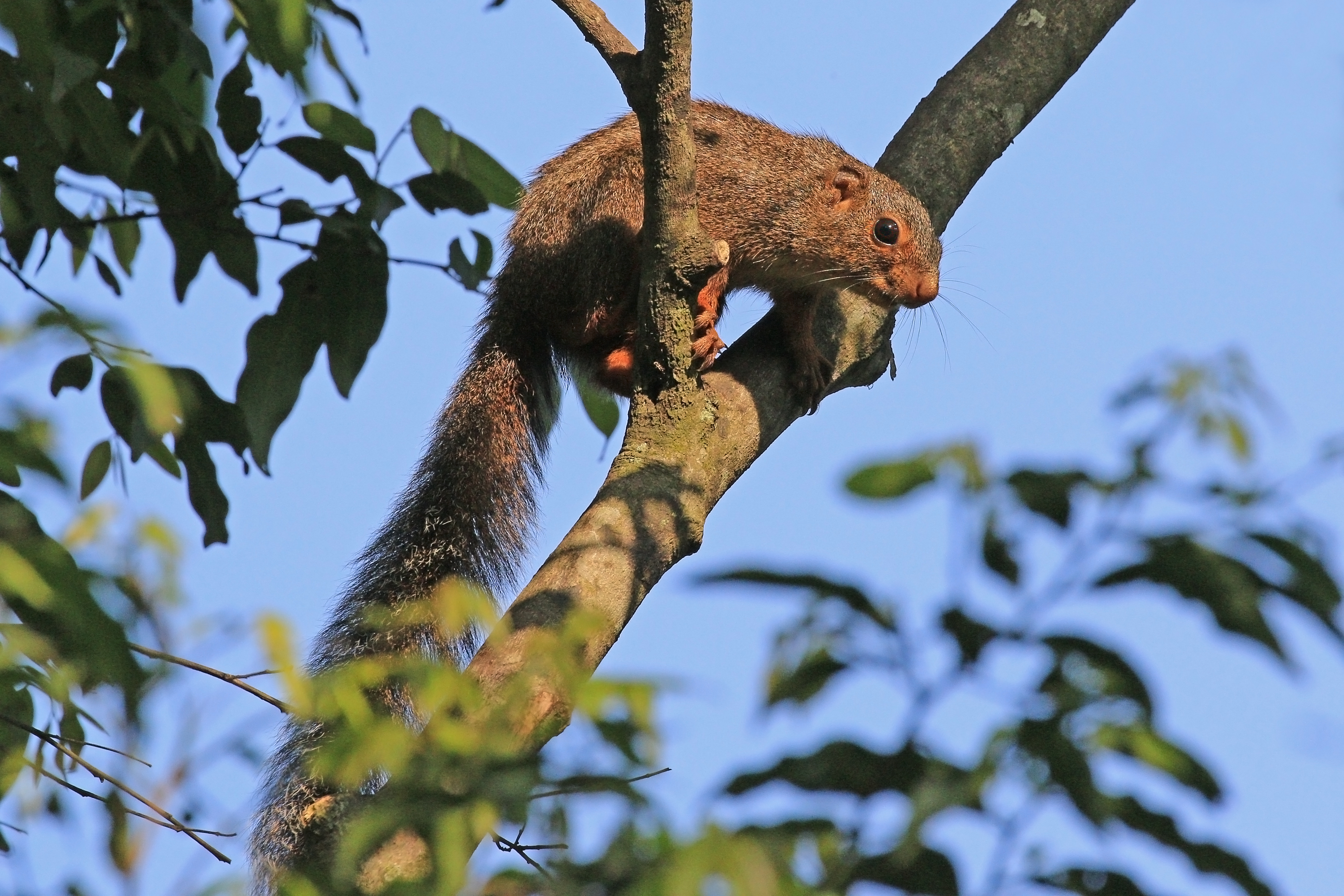
- H. rufobrachium, Uganda

Scientific classification
- Domain: Eukaryota
- Kingdom: Animalia
- Phylum: Chordata
- Class: Mammalia
- Order: Rodentia
- Family: Sciuridae
- Tribe: Protoxerini
- Genus: Heliosciurus; Trouessart, 1880

Type species
- Sciurus gambianus Ogilby, 1835

Species
- Heliosciurus gambianus; Heliosciurus mutabilis; Heliosciurus punctatus; Heliosciurus rufobrachium; Heliosciurus ruwenzorii; Heliosciurus undulatus

= Sun squirrel =

Sun squirrels Temporal range: Late Pleistocene to Recent

Genus of rodents

Sun squirrels (genus Heliosciurus), form a taxon of squirrels under the subfamily Xerinae and the tribe Protoxerini. They are only found in sub-Saharan Africa.

Either the habit of basking in the sun on tree branches or the tail being commonly used as a sunshade gave this group its common name.

Sun squirrels have been implicated in the spread of human monkeypox in the Democratic Republic of the Congo.

There are six species in the genus:

- Gambian sun squirrel, Heliosciurus gambianus
- Mutable sun squirrel, Heliosciurus mutabilis
- Small sun squirrel, Heliosciurus punctatus
- Red-legged sun squirrel, Heliosciurus rufobrachium
- Ruwenzori sun squirrel, Heliosciurus ruwenzorii
- Zanj sun squirrel, Heliosciurus undulatus
