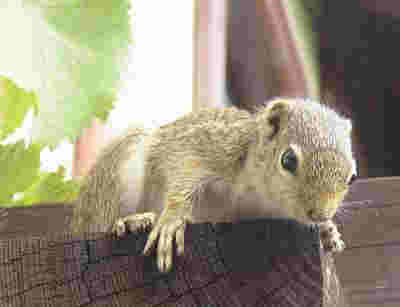

Conservation status
- Least Concern (IUCN 3.1)

Scientific classification
- Kingdom: Animalia
- Phylum: Chordata
- Class: Mammalia
- Order: Rodentia
- Family: Sciuridae
- Genus: Heliosciurus
- Species: H. gambianus

Binomial name
- Heliosciurus gambianus (Ogilby, 1835)

Subspecies
- H. g. gambianus; H. g. abassensis; H. g. bongensis; H. g. canaster; H. g. dysoni; H. g. elegans; H. g. hoogstraali; H. g. kaffensis; H. g. lateris; H. g. limbutas; H. g. loandicus; H. g. madogae; H. g. multicolor; H. g. omensis; H. g. rhodesiae; H. g. senescens

Synonyms
- Sciurus gambianus

= Gambian sun squirrel =

Species of rodent

The Gambian sun squirrel (Heliosciurus gambianus) is a species of rodent in the family Sciuridae. It is found in Angola, Benin, Burkina Faso, Central African Republic, Chad, Democratic Republic of the Congo, Ivory Coast, Eritrea, Ethiopia, Gambia, Ghana, Guinea, Guinea-Bissau, Kenya, Liberia, Nigeria, Senegal, Sierra Leone, Sudan, Tanzania, Togo, Uganda, and Zambia. Its natural habitat is wooded savanna.

== Taxonomy ==
The Gambian sun squirrel was first described by the Irish naturalist William Ogilby in 1835 as Sciurus gambianus. It was designated the type species of the genus Heliosciurus after the International Commission on Zoological Nomenclature decided to suppress the use of Sciurus annulatus for this purpose in 1957. It is probably a species complex of several described species.

== Description ==
The Gambian sun squirrel has a head-and-body length of between 170 and 240 mm (6.7 and 9.4 in) and a tail of between 180 and 260 mm (7.1 and 10.2 in). Its weight ranges from 240 to 330 g (8.5 to 11.6 oz). The pelage is variably coloured but is usually greyish with a grizzled appearance. There is a paler grey ring around the eye, and the throat and underparts are also pale. The tail is boldly ringed in black and white, there being about fourteen rings.

== Distribution and habitat ==
The Gambian sun squirrel occurs across tropical Africa, its range extending from Senegal and the Gambia, to Ethiopia and Kenya. A separate population is further south in Angola and Tanzania. It inhabits wooded savanna and other grassland with scattered trees, moving through the branches but sometimes descending to the ground. It also inhabits plantations and other cultivated areas.

== Status ==
The Gambian sun squirrel is a common grassland species with a wide range and a presumed large total population. The population trend has not been evaluated but no particular threats have been recognised; it is able to adapt to habitats modified by humans and is present in a number of protected areas. For these reasons, the International Union for Conservation of Nature has assessed its conservation status as being of "least concern".
