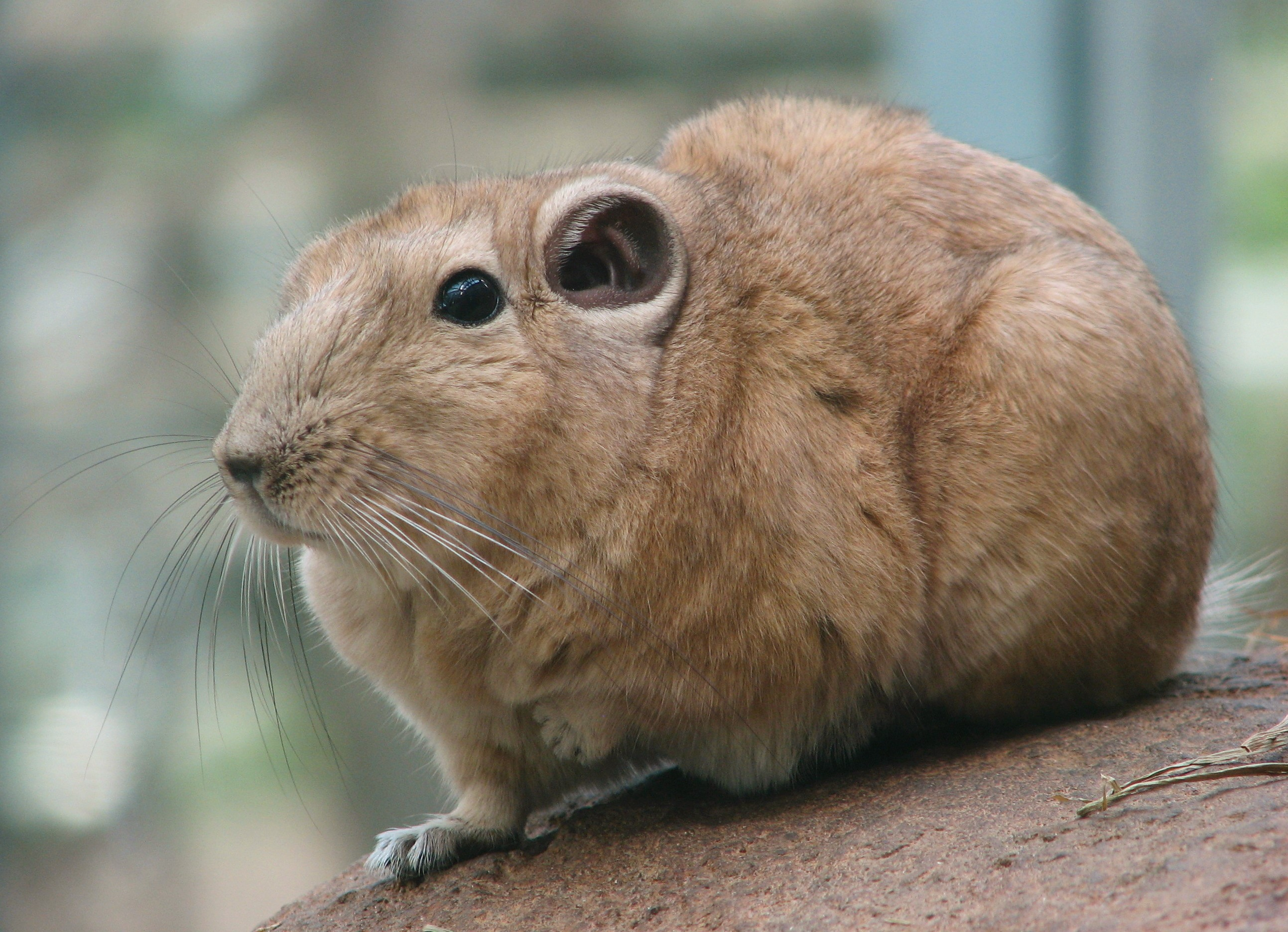
- Ctenodactylus gundi

Scientific classification
- Kingdom: Animalia
- Phylum: Chordata
- Class: Mammalia
- Infraclass: Placentalia
- Order: Rodentia
- Infraorder: Ctenodactylomorphi
- Family: Ctenodactylidae; Gervais, 1853

Type genus
- Ctenodactylus Gray, 1830

Genera
- Ctenodactylus; Felovia; Massoutiera; Pectinator
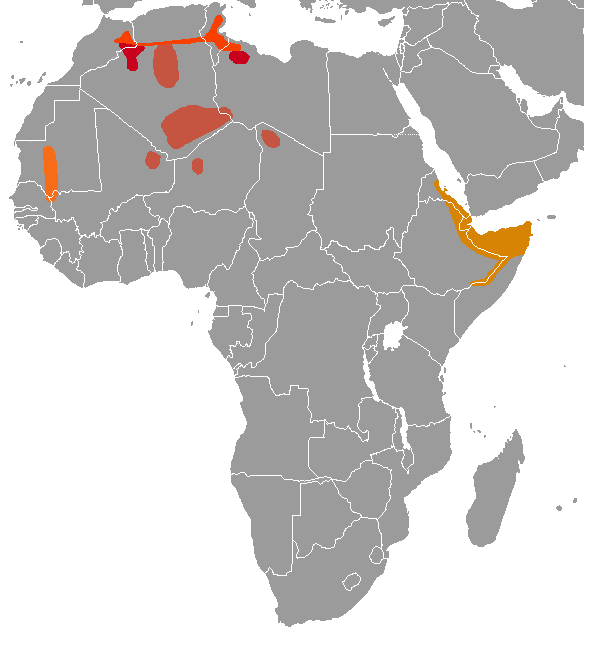

= Gundi =

Gundi Temporal range: Early Oligocene – Recent

Family of rodents

Gundis or comb rats are a group of small, stocky, African rodents in the family Ctenodactylidae. They live in rocky deserts across Northern Africa. The family comprises four living genera and five species (Speke's gundi, Felou gundi, Val's or desert gundi, common or North African gundi and Mzab gundi), as well as numerous extinct genera and species. They are in the superfamily Ctenodactyloidea. Local people in northern Africa have always known about gundis, however they first came to the notice of Western naturalists in Tripoli in 1774, and were given the name gundi mice. While they are not regarded as pests, some people hunt gundis for food.

All living gundi species are members of the Ctenodactylinae sub-family. The Ctenodactylidae family also includes three extinct sub-families, Tataromyinae, Karakoromyinae and Dystylomyinae. The genus name comes from Ancient Greek κτείς (kteís), meaning "comb", and δάκτυλος (dáktulos), meaning "finger".

== Description ==
Gundis are from 17 to 18 cm in body length, with compact bodies covered in soft fur, short legs, and large eyes. They have only four toes on all feet and the middle toes of the hind feet carry comb-like bristles, which earned them the name "comb rat". Gundis have short tails, which in some species are covered in a large fan of hair that aids in balancing as they move about their rocky and uneven environments. Their ribcages are flexible, which helps them fit into small crevices.

Gundis are herbivorous, eating almost every type of available plant. Like many other desert animals, they do not drink, obtaining all the moisture they need from their food. Their incisors lack the layer of tough, orange, enamel found in other rodents, and they have a dental formula of:

Dentition
1.0.1-2.3
1.0.1-2.3

Females typically give birth to two young at a time, after a gestation period of about two months. Because of the need to preserve moisture, female gundis produce only a small amount of milk, and the young are fully weaned by four weeks of age. On average, female gundis are bigger than males. Gundis live about 3 to 4 years in the wild.

== Habitat and behavior ==
Gundis live in all manner of rocky desert habitats: cliffs, hills, rocky outcrops, scree slopes, and so on. They are found between sea level and 2,500 meters in elevation.

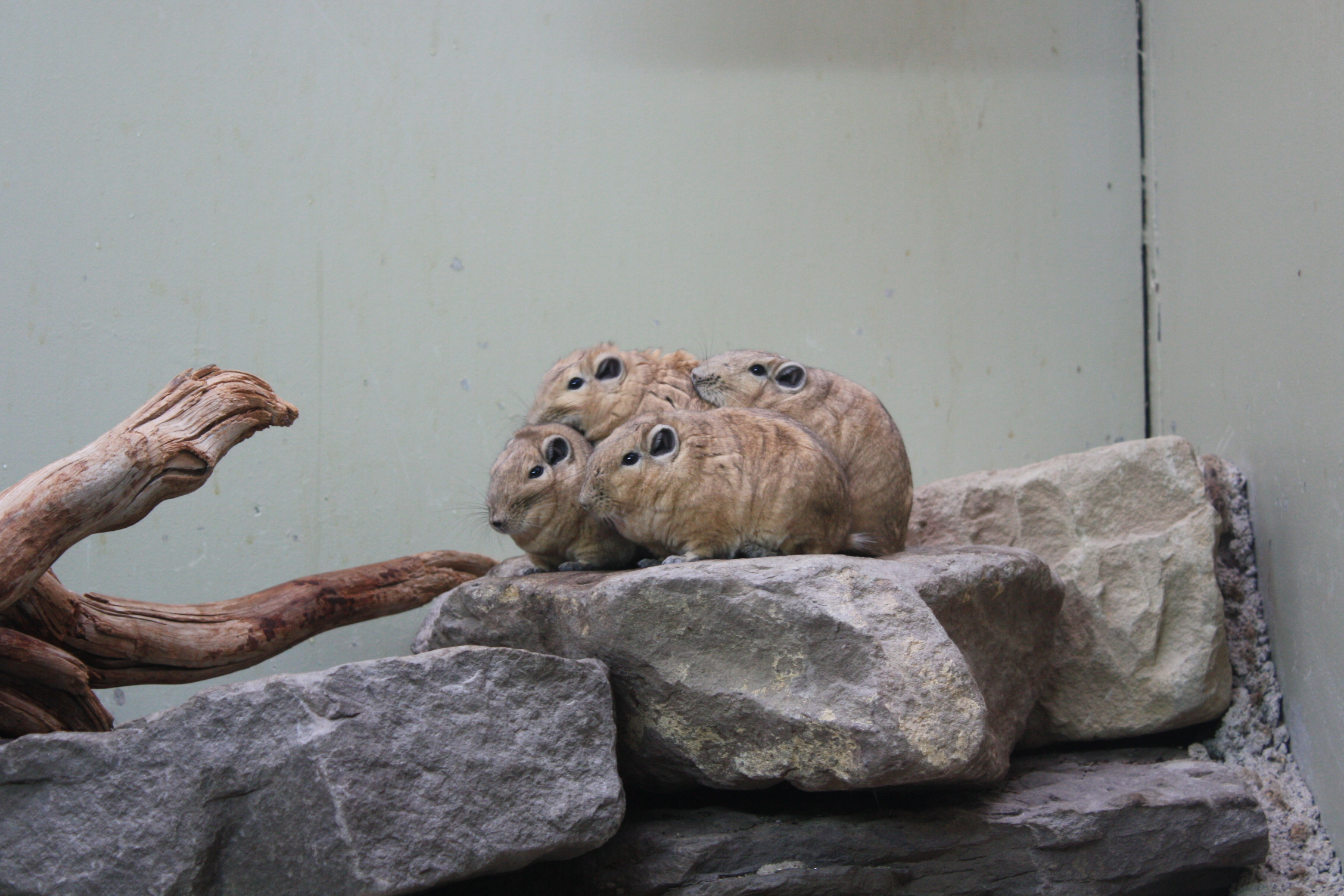
Life in colonies

Gundis live in colonies of up to a hundred or more individuals, although colonies are smaller in environments where food is particularly scarce. They shelter in existing rock crevices at night, or during midday when the sun becomes too hot for them to remain active. Most shelters are temporary, but some are occupied for years. Gundis pile onto each other for heat, especially in cold or windy weather. They are not known to hibernate. Gundi colonies have a dunghill that all the members of the colony use.

Gundis are vocal animals, with a range of alarm calls and communication signals for group bonding, greetings, and alerting other gundis of predators. All members of Ctenodactylidae thump their hind feet on the ground when alarmed. Gundis rely on their acute hearing.

If a gundi is threatened, it will run to the nearest rock crevice or play dead. While gundis are generally slow, they can sprint when threatened. Gundis can also climb up almost vertical surfaces.

== Evolution ==
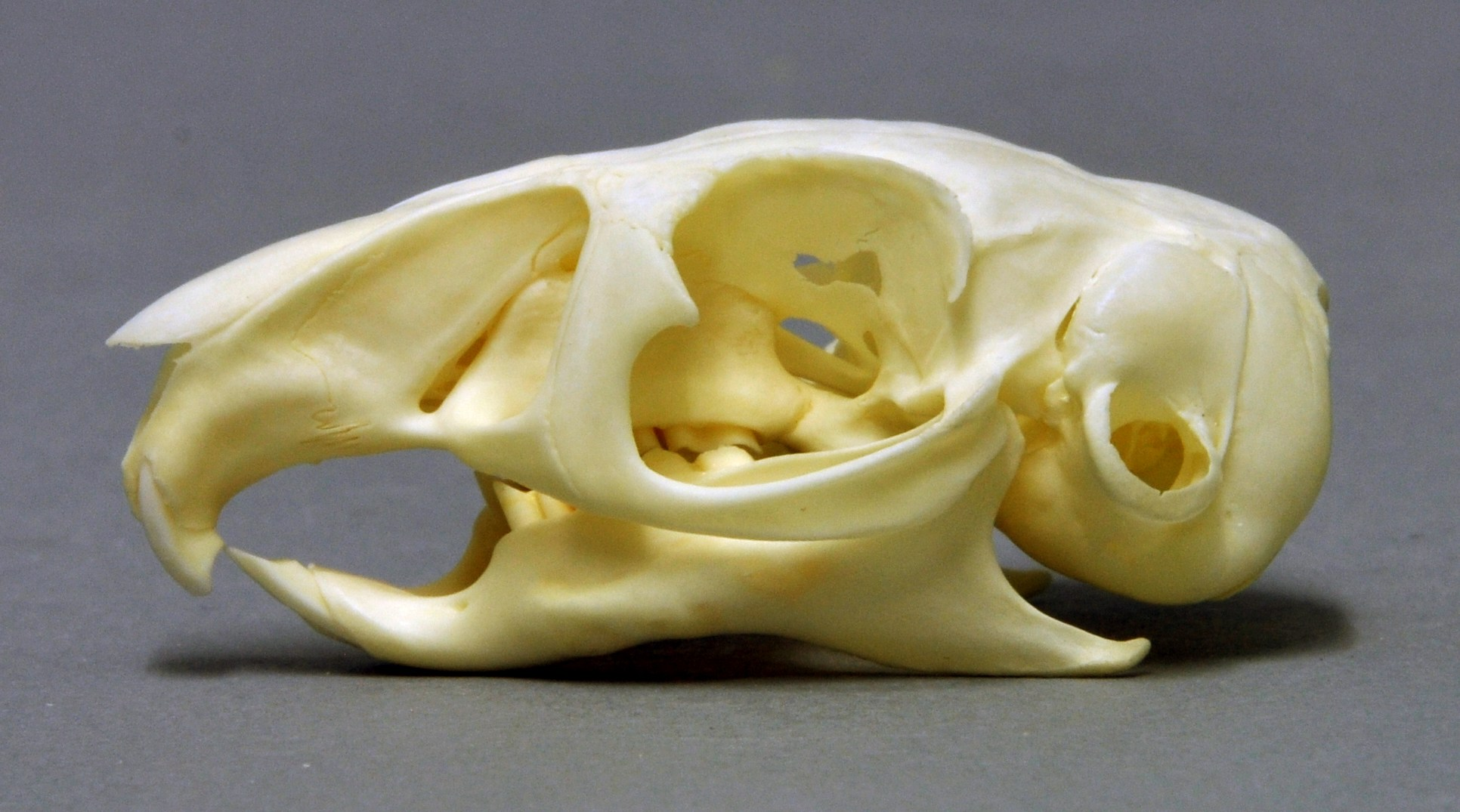
Skull of Ctenodactylus gundi

According to a DNA sequence study, the ancestors of the gundis diverged from those of the Laotian rock rat around the Lutetian, some 44 million years ago (Early/Middle Eocene).

Fossils within Ctenodactylidae have been found in Asia, dating back to the mid-Eocene. Gundi fossils from the Pleistocene have been found in Asia, North Africa, and parts of Italy.

== Taxonomy ==
- Ctenodactylidae
  - Ctenodactylus
    - Common gundi, Ctenodactylus gundi
    - Val's gundi, Ctenodactylus vali
  - Felovia
    - Felou gundi, Felovia vae
  - Massoutiera
    - Mzab gundi, Massoutiera mzabi
  - Pectinator
    - Speke's pectinator, Pectinator spekei

== See also ==
- Toxoplasma gondii, a parasite named for the gundi, the host in which it was discovered
