= Outline of Libya =

Overview of and topical guide to Libya

The following outline is provided as an overview of and topical guide to Libya:

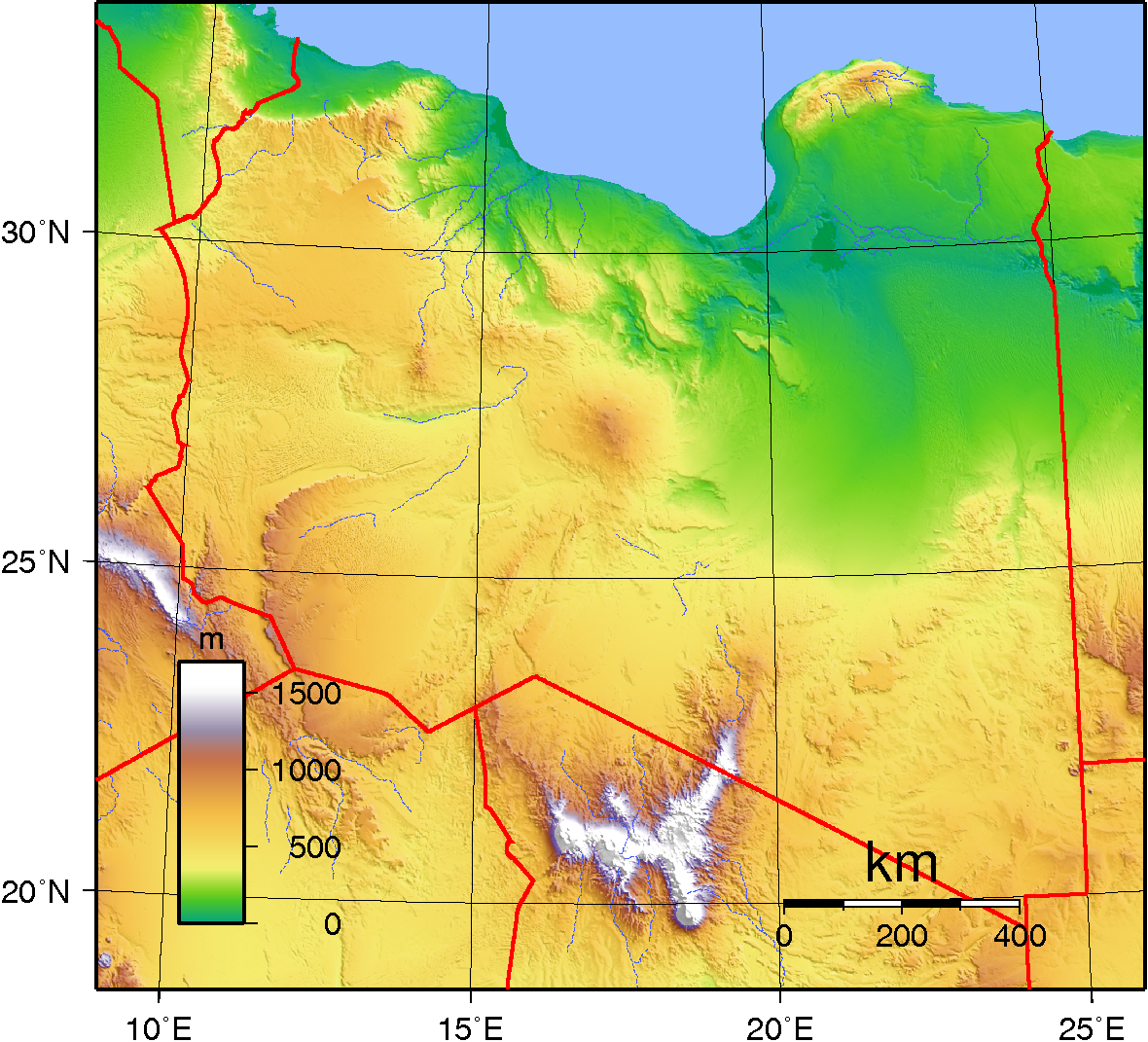
An enlargeable topographic map of Libya

Libya – country in the Maghreb region of North Africa bordered by the Mediterranean Sea to the north, Egypt to the east, Sudan to the southeast, Chad and Niger to the south, and Algeria and Tunisia to the west.

== General reference ==
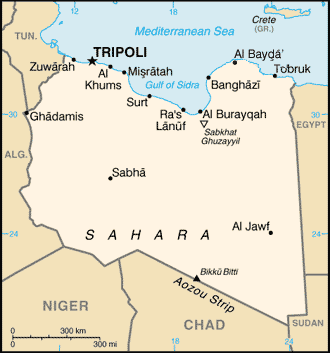
An enlargeable basic map of Libya

- Pronunciation: /ˈlɪbiə/
- Common English country name: Libya
- Official English country name: Libya, or Libyan Republic
- Common endonym(s):
- Official endonym(s):
- Adjectival(s): Libyan
- Demonym(s): Libyan(s)
- Etymology: Name of Libya
- International rankings of Libya
- ISO country codes: LY, LBY, 434
- ISO region codes: See ISO 3166-2:LY
- Internet country code top-level domain: .ly

== Geography of Libya ==
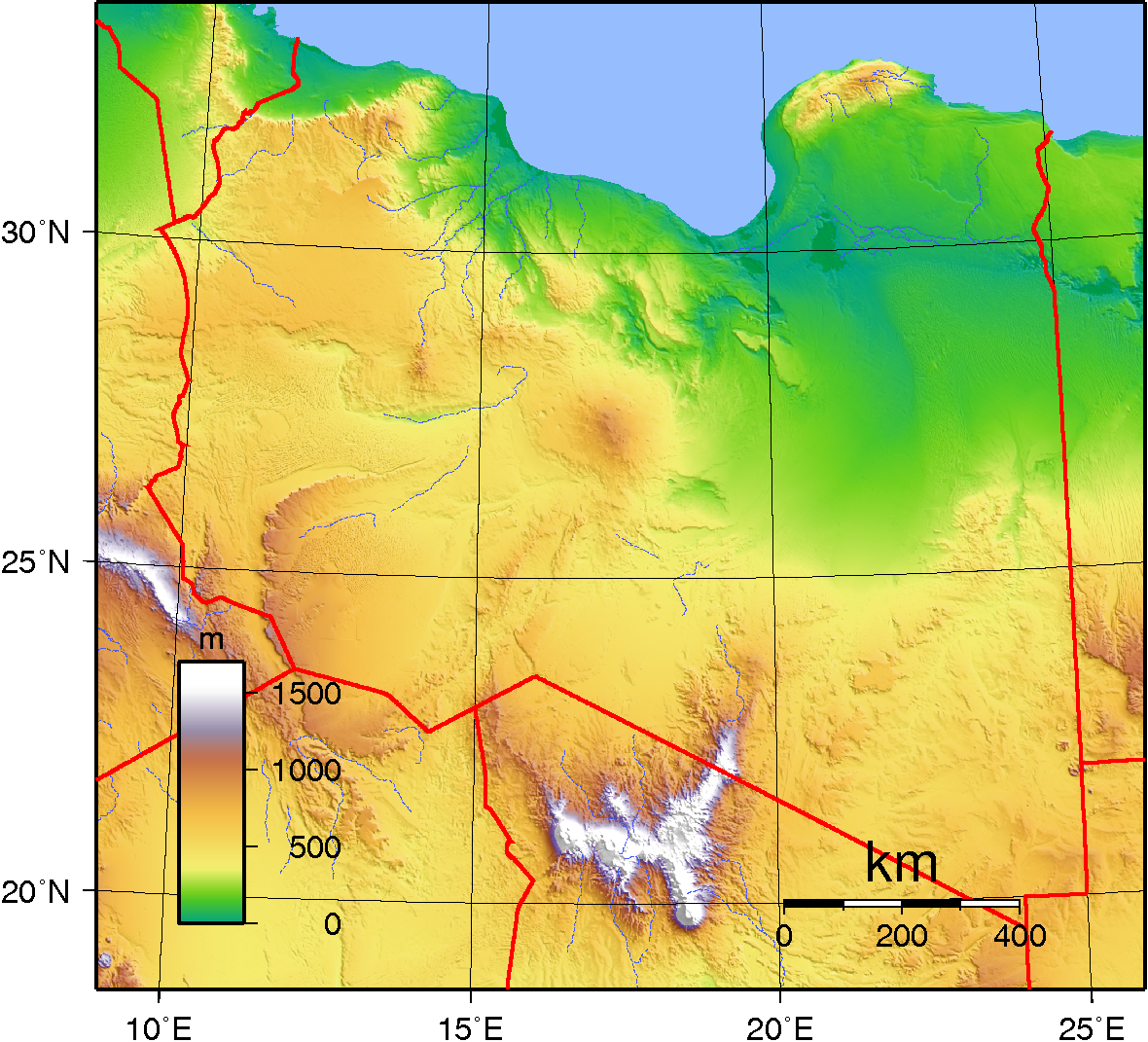
An enlargeable topographic map of Libya

- Libya is: a country
- Location
  - Libya is situated within the following regions:
    - Northern Hemisphere and Eastern Hemisphere
    - Africa
      - North Africa
      - Sahara Desert
    - Greater Middle East
  - Time zone: Central Africa Time (UTC+02)
  - Extreme points of Libya
    - High: Bikku Bitti 2,267 m (7,438 ft)
    - Low: Sabkhat Ghuzayyil −47 m (−154 ft)
  - Land boundaries: 4,348 km

Egypt 1,115 km
Chad 1,055 km
Algeria 982 km
Tunisia 459 km
Sudan 383 km
Niger 354 km

- Coastline: Mediterranean Sea 1,770 km

- Population of Libya: 6,160,000 - 102nd most populous country
- Area of Libya: 1,759,541 km^{2}
- Atlas of Libya

=== Environment of Libya ===
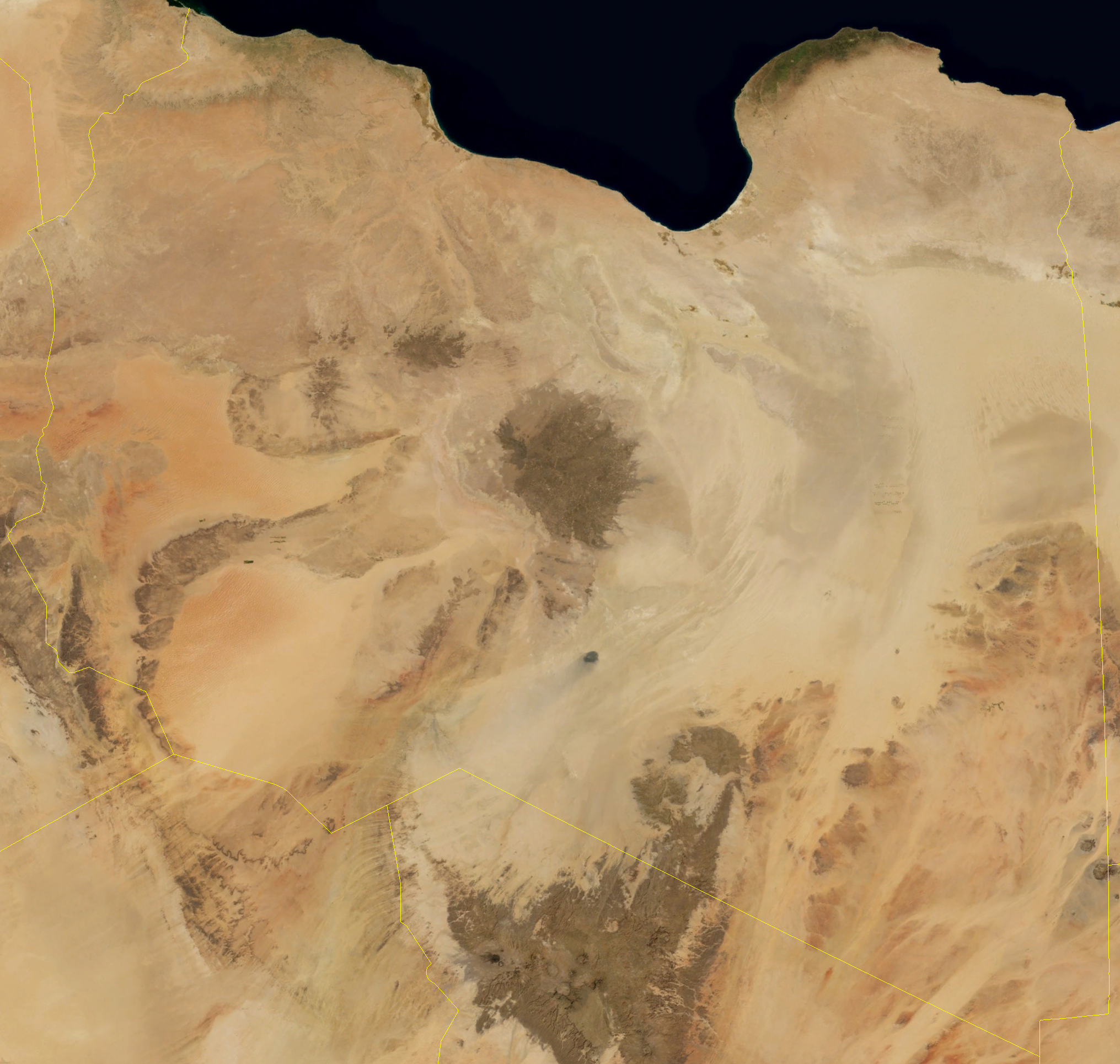
An enlargeable satellite image of Libya

Environment of Libya

- Climate of Libya
- Environmental issues in Libya
- Ecoregions in Libya
- Protected areas of Libya
  - National parks of Libya
- Wildlife of Libya
  - Flora of Libya
  - Fauna of Libya
    - Birds of Libya
    - Mammals of Libya

==== Natural geographic features of Libya ====
- Glaciers in Libya: none
- Mountains of Libya
  - Volcanoes in Libya
- Rivers of Libya
- World Heritage Sites in Libya

==== Ecoregions of Libya ====
List of ecoregions in Libya

==== Administrative divisions of Libya ====
- Districts of Libya
- Baladiyat of Libya
- Governorates of Libya
- Capital of Libya: Tripoli
- Cities of Libya

=== Demography of Libya ===
Demographics of Libya

== Government and politics of Libya ==
Politics of Libya

- Form of government:
- Capital of Libya: Tripoli
- Elections in Libya
- Political parties in Libya

=== Branches of the government of Libya ===
Government of Libya

==== Executive branch of the government of Libya ====
- Head of state: Chairman of the Presidential Council of Libya, Vacant
  - Vice-Chairman, Musa Al-Koni
  - Vice-Chairman, Abdullah al-Lafi
- Head of government: Prime Minister of Libya, Abdul Hamid Dbeibeh
- Cabinet of Libya

==== Legislative branch of the government of Libya ====
- Council of Deputies (unicameral)

==== Judicial branch of the government of Libya ====
Court system of Libya

=== Foreign relations of Libya ===
Foreign relations of Libya

- Diplomatic missions in Libya
- Diplomatic missions of Libya

==== International organization membership ====
Libya is a member of:

- African Development Bank Group (AfDB)
- African Union (AU)
- African Union/United Nations Hybrid operation in Darfur (UNAMID)
- Arab Bank for Economic Development in Africa (ABEDA)
- Arab Fund for Economic and Social Development (AFESD)
- Arab Maghreb Union (AMU)
- Arab Monetary Fund (AMF)
- Common Market for Eastern and Southern Africa (COMESA)
- Council of Arab Economic Unity (CAEU)
- Food and Agriculture Organization (FAO)
- Group of 77 (G77)
- International Atomic Energy Agency (IAEA)
- International Bank for Reconstruction and Development (IBRD)
- International Civil Aviation Organization (ICAO)
- International Criminal Police Organization (Interpol)
- International Development Association (IDA)
- International Federation of Red Cross and Red Crescent Societies (IFRCS)
- International Finance Corporation (IFC)
- International Fund for Agricultural Development (IFAD)
- International Labour Organization (ILO)
- International Maritime Organization (IMO)
- International Mobile Satellite Organization (IMSO)
- International Monetary Fund (IMF)
- International Olympic Committee (IOC)
- International Organization for Migration (IOM)
- International Organization for Standardization (ISO)
- International Red Cross and Red Crescent Movement (ICRM)
- International Telecommunication Union (ITU)
- International Telecommunications Satellite Organization (ITSO)
- Inter-Parliamentary Union (IPU)
- Islamic Development Bank (IDB)
- League of Arab States (LAS)
- Multilateral Investment Guarantee Agency (MIGA)
- Nonaligned Movement (NAM)
- Organisation of Islamic Cooperation (OIC)
- Organisation for the Prohibition of Chemical Weapons (OPCW)
- Organization of Arab Petroleum Exporting Countries (OAPEC)
- Organization of Petroleum Exporting Countries (OPEC)
- Permanent Court of Arbitration (PCA)
- United Nations (UN)
- United Nations Conference on Trade and Development (UNCTAD)
- United Nations Educational, Scientific, and Cultural Organization (UNESCO)
- United Nations Industrial Development Organization (UNIDO)
- Universal Postal Union (UPU)
- World Confederation of Labour (WCL)
- World Customs Organization (WCO)
- World Federation of Trade Unions (WFTU)
- World Health Organization (WHO)
- World Intellectual Property Organization (WIPO)
- World Meteorological Organization (WMO)
- World Tourism Organization (UNWTO)
- World Trade Organization (WTO) (observer)

=== Law and order in Libya ===
Law of Libya

- Constitution of Libya
- Law Enforcement in Libya
- Human rights in Libya
  - LGBT rights in Libya
  - Women in Libya

=== Military of Libya ===
Military of Libya

- Command
  - Commander-in-chief:
- Forces
  - Army of Libya
  - Navy of Libya
  - Air Force of Libya
- Military history of Libya

=== Local government in Libya ===
Local government in Libya

== History of Libya ==
=== History of Libya by period ===
- Prehistory of Libya
- Ancient Libya (before 146 BC)
- Roman Libya (146 BC – 640 AD)
- History of Islamic Tripolitania and Cyrenaica (Arab rule) (640–1551)
- Ottoman Tripolitania (1551–1911)
- History of Libya as Italian colony (1911–1934)
- Italian Libya (1934–1943)
- Allied occupation of Libya (1943–1951)
- Kingdom of Libya (1951–1969)
- History of Libya under Muammar Gaddafi (1969–2011)
- Libyan civil war (2011)
  - Timeline of the 2011 Libyan civil war
  - 2011 military intervention in Libya
    - United Nations Security Council Resolution 1973
    - International reactions to the 2011 military intervention in Libya
  - Battle of Sirte (2011)
  - Death of Muammar Gaddafi
    - International reactions to the death of Muammar Gaddafi
- Libya in transition (2011–)
  - National Transitional Council

=== History of Libya by subject ===
- Military history of Libya
- List of heads of government of Libya

== Culture of Libya ==
- Cuisine of Libya
- Languages of Libya
- Media in Libya
- National symbols of Libya
  - Coat of arms of Libya
  - Flag of Libya
  - National anthem of Libya
- Public holidays in Libya
- Religion in Libya
  - Buddhism in Libya
  - Christianity in Libya
  - Hinduism in Libya
  - Islam in Libya
  - Judaism in Libya
- World Heritage Sites in Libya

=== Art in Libya ===
- Literature of Libya
- Music of Libya
- Television in Libya

=== Sports in Libya ===
Sports in Libya

- Football in Libya
- Libya at the Olympics

== Economy and infrastructure of Libya ==
- Economic rank, by nominal GDP (2007): 62nd (sixty-second)
- Agriculture in Libya
- Communications in Libya
  - Internet in Libya
- Companies of Libya
- Currency of Libya: Dinar
  - ISO 4217: LYD
- Energy in Libya
- Health care in Libya
- Mining in Libya
- Tourism in Libya
- Transport in Libya
  - Airports in Libya
  - Rail transport in Libya

== See also ==
Libya

- List of international rankings
- List of Libya-related topics
- Member state of the United Nations
- Outline of Africa
- Outline of geography
