= Buddhism in Libya =

According to Libya's 2007 census, Libya has more than 15,010 workers from Sri Lanka and other countries with Buddhist populations (about 12,000 Koreans and more than 2,000 citizens from China) which made up about 0.3% of total population of Libya. As a result, Libya has one of highest proportions of Buddhists in North Africa despite there not being any Buddhist pagodas or temples.

Theravada Buddhists make up two thirds and are primarily Sinhalese while the remaining third follow East Asian Buddhism and are Korean or Chinese nationals.

== History ==
Hegesias of Cyrene was a philosopher of the Cyrenaic school around 290 BC. It has been thought by some that Hegesias was influenced by Greco-Buddhism.

== See also ==
- Hinduism in Libya
