= Tourism in Libya =

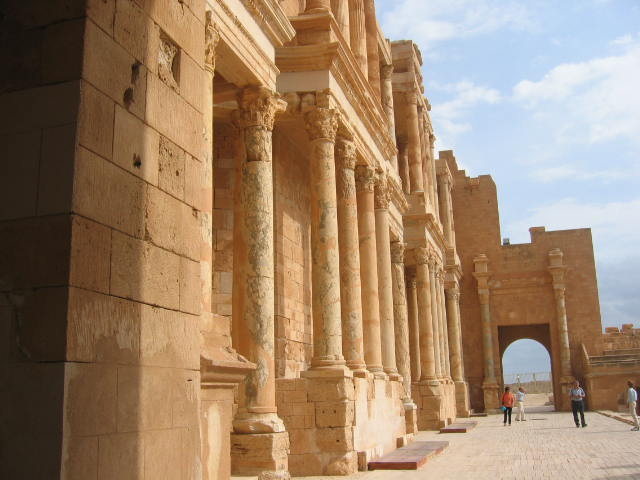
A tourist group at Theatre at Sabratha, 2006; one of the primary tourist sites in Libya.

Tourism in Libya is an industry heavily hit by the Libyan Civil War. Before the war tourism was developing, with 149,000 tourists visiting Libya in 2004, rising to 180,000 in 2007, although this still only contributed less than 1% of the country's GDP. There were 1,000,000 day visitors in the same year. The country is best known for its ancient Greek and Roman ruins and Sahara desert landscapes. As of 2025, tourist numbers have returned to approximately 100,000 annually.

Libya is not issuing tourist visas now. Libyan borders with Chad, Niger, Sudan and Algeria are closed. In reality these borders are not controlled by the Government but by Tuareg people and Toubou people.

As of 2017, governments of the United States, New Zealand, Australia, Canada, Ireland, the United Kingdom, Spain, France, Hungary, Latvia, Germany, Austria, Bulgaria, Norway, Croatia, Romania, Slovenia, Czech Republic, Russia, Denmark, Slovakia, Estonia, Italy, Poland, South Korea, the Republic of China Japan and India advise their citizens against all (or in some cases all but essential) travel to Libya.

== Main sites ==
=== Tourism in Libya ===
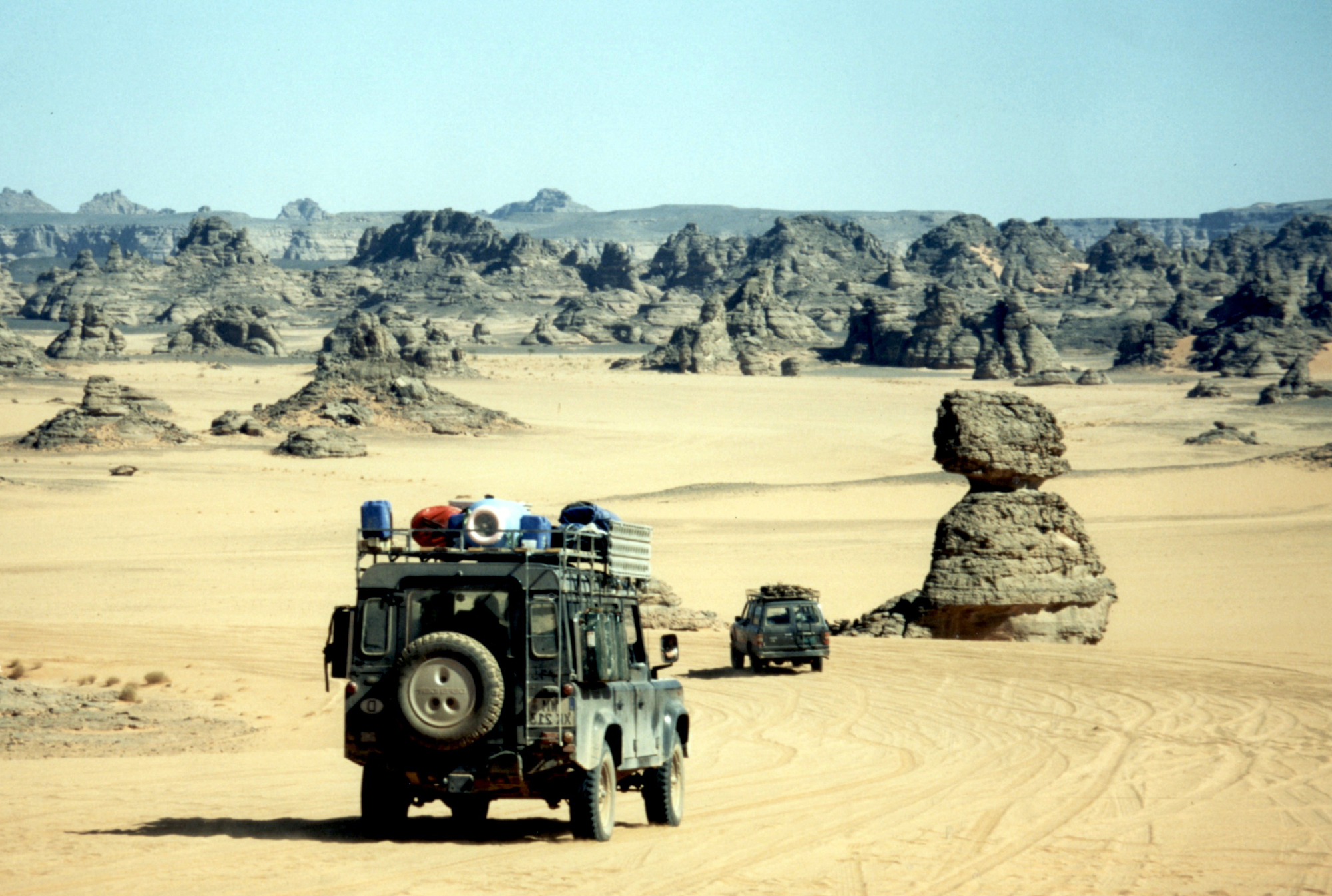
Exploring the Acacus Mountains.

Tourism in Libya is not very developed due to the continuous political changes that have taken place in the country, the military conflicts, the lack of security, the theological reasons linked to traditionalist neo-fundamentalism, the difficulty in obtaining tourist visas, the lack of infrastructures, protection of archaeological areas, lack of competent human resources, insufficient budget and no action plans.

The United Nations international embargo, which has been recently lifted, has been a major deterrent for tourists. It has resulted in delays in tourism development and made it difficult for tourists, who have instead had to travel through an arduous, physically exhausting way into and out of the country through the Tunisia-Libya land border. International tourism into Libya has suffered due to the instability caused by the Libyan Civil War. The Libyan dinar has highly appreciated, which leads to uncompetitive prices for tourist related services such as accommodation and transportation, compared with neighboring countries.

There are various types of tourism in Libya:

- military/war, Libya has been the area of numerous battles including the Second World War, there are many key sites equipped with war relics, monuments and memorials
- artistic (Ghadames Festival, Ghat Festival, Nalut Spring Festival, Zuwarah Awessu Festival)
- maritime-seaside like archaeological diving, ancient harbors, underwater physical attraction
- Islamic tourism has a high potential because there are ancient ruins, mosques and many examples of Islamic architecture. Sirte and Ajdabiya are key sites of Islamic heritage

From the 1970s to the 1980s the tourist influx was discouraged for religious reasons and related to xenophobia. Only in the 1990s did the Libyan government decide to diversify its national sources of income through the enhancement of its ancient historical sites and its cultural heritage, making progress in providing the necessary facilities for welcoming tourists.

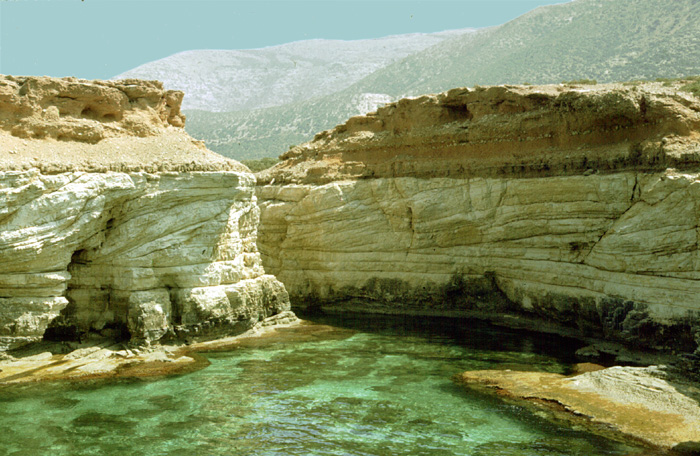
Mediterranean rocky coast of Libya

In 1999, the Libyan Government in cooperation with United Nations World Tourism Organizations has made a plan to improve tourism which provided for the development of the tourism sector through the establishment of policy frameworks, strategic guidelines and objectives lasting five years.

On 6 May 2006, was created the Hammamet Declaration, a document whose purpose was to harmonize tourism development in the countries of the western Mediterranean basin, taking into account environmental and social differences. The aim was to create a cultural and ecological tourism that encouraged projects based on the principles of sustainability, respect for the environment and the use of local products. The Libyan General Board For Tourism and Traditional Industry (GBTII) stated that the authorities were planning a major tourism plan in the private and foreign sector; with the construction of a large number of hotels in major cities to meet the increase in tourists.

In 2011, with the fall of the Gaddafi government and the beginning of the civil war, they led to more restrictions and significant changes for tourists. In 2012 the new government decided to diversify resources and create jobs, the authorities changed the laws and regulations to attract foreign economic investments and make the economy grow. But the two rival governments have not pushed the project forward. On 22 March 2012, the Ministry of Tourism "The General Board For Tourism And Antiquities" was created.

=== Archeological sites ===
Cultural tourism is Libya's biggest draw as a tourism destination. There are five UNESCO World Heritage Sites in the country, three of which are classical ruins. The Roman cities of Sabratha and Leptis Magna in Western Libya and the Greek ruins of Cyrene in the east are big tourist attractions.

==== Roman sites ====
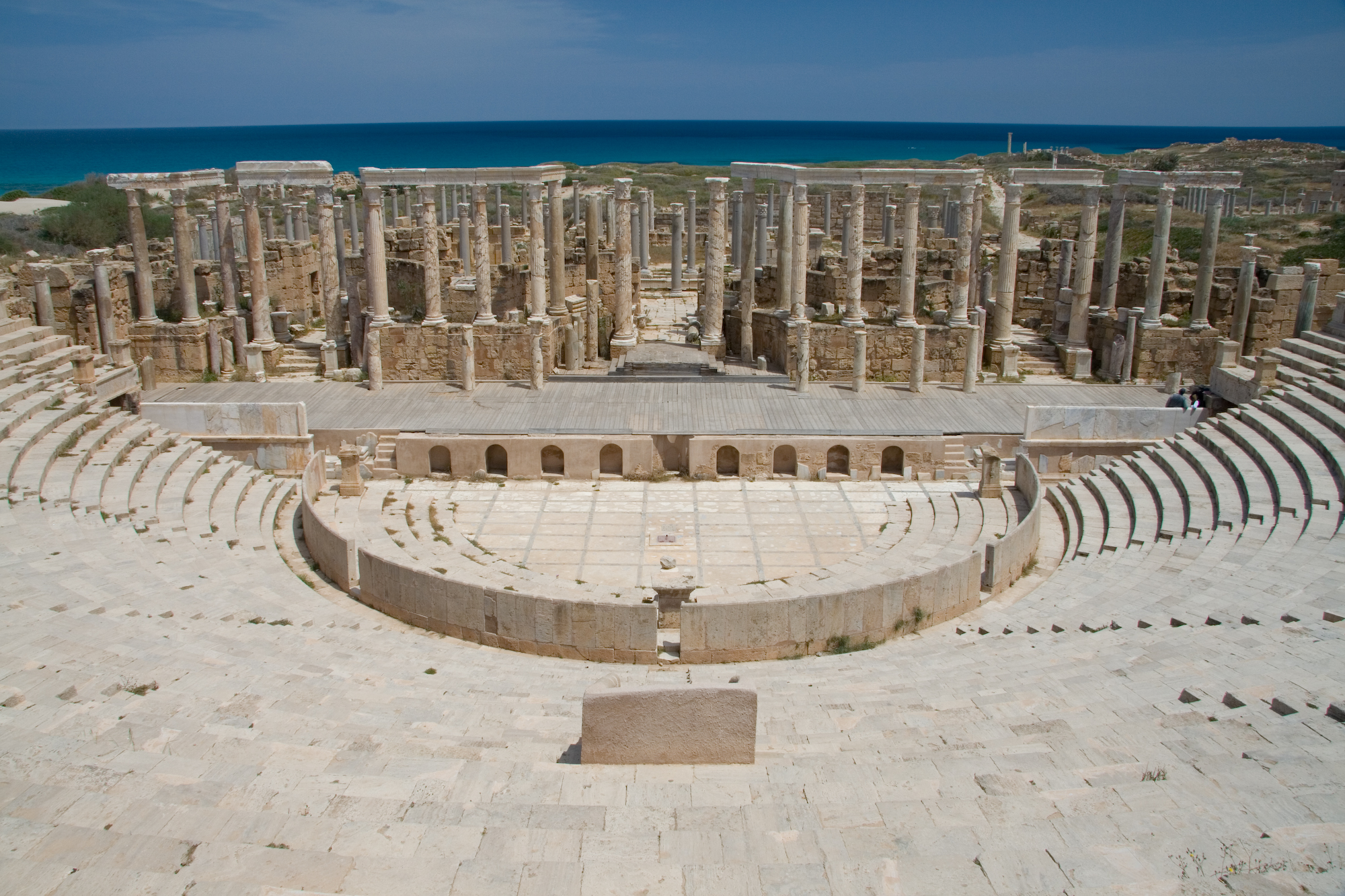
The theatre at Leptis Magna

The Roman city of Sabratha lies 80 km (50 mi) west of the capital Tripoli. The port was established as a Phoenician trading-post around 500 BC. It later became part of the short-lived Numidian Kingdom of Massinissa before being Romanised and rebuilt in the 2nd and 3rd centuries AD. The city was badly damaged by earthquakes during the 4th century, and was rebuilt on a more modest scale by Byzantine governors. Besides the well preserved late 3rd century theatre, that retains its three-storey architectural backdrop, Sabratha has temples dedicated to Liber Pater, Serapis and Isis. There is a Christian basilica of the time of Justinian and remnants of some of the mosaic floors that enriched elite dwellings of Roman North Africa; the Villa Sileen near Al-Khoms is a good example. The mosaics are most clearly preserved in the coloured patterns of the seaward (or Forum) baths, directly overlooking the shore, and in the black and white floors of the theatre baths. There is a museum adjacent to the site which contains some excavated artifacts, whilst others are displayed at the National Museum in Tripoli.

Leptis Magna is the largest Roman city in Libya, and its ruins are some of the most complete and best preserved in the Mediterranean, providing Libya's biggest tourist attraction. Leptis Magna was founded by the Phoenicians in the 10th century BC. It survived the attention of Spartan colonists, and became a Punic city and eventually part of the new Roman province of Africa around 23 BC. As a Roman city it prospered, with figures like Emperor Septimius Severus as one of its emperors. The city was sacked by a Berber tribe in 523 AD, and later abandoned and reclaimed by the desert. Although it provided a source of building materials to various looters throughout history, it was not excavated until the 1920s. Today the site has many monuments still intact. The theatre is the most obvious, and has good panoramic views of the city from its upper tiers. The Hadrianic Baths are another attraction, and one of the pools, measuring 28 times 15 metre, remains intact. This bath house was one of the largest that was ever built outside Rome. The circus, nearly a kilometre away from the main site, remains still only partly excavated. At 450 by 100 metres, it was one of the largest in the entire Roman world. It is also the only one of its kind in Libya today. The Leptis Magna Museum of Leptis Magna contains many excavated artifacts, as well as recent discoveries such as five colorful mosaics created during the 1st or 2nd century AD.

==== Greek sites ====
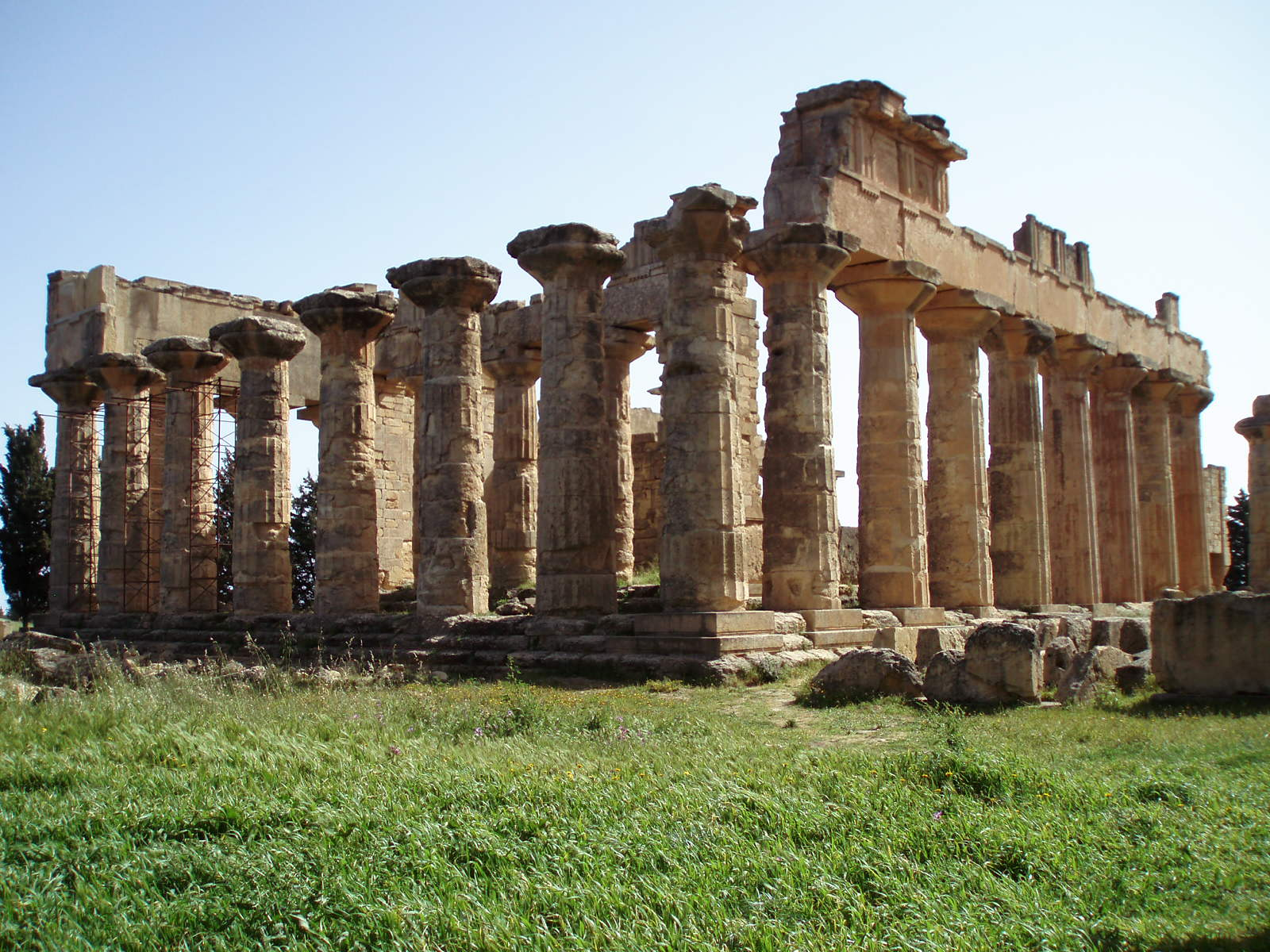
The temple of Zeus in Cyrene, Eastern Libya

Although Cyrene was later incorporated into the Roman Empire, it was founded in 630 BC as a colony of the Greeks from the Greek island of Thera. 16 kilometers from Cyrene is the port of Apollonia (Marsa Sousa). The city promptly became the chief town of ancient Libya and established commercial relations with all the Greek cities, reaching the height of its prosperity under its own kings in the 5th century BC. Soon after 460 BC, it became a republic, and after the death of Alexander III of Macedon (323 BC) it was passed to the Ptolemaic dynasty.

Ophelas, the general who occupied the city in Ptolemy I's name, ruled the city almost independently until his death, when Ptolemy's son-in-law Magas received governorship of the territory. In 276 BC Magas crowned himself king and declared de facto independence, marrying the daughter of the Seleucid king and forming with him an alliance in order to invade Egypt. The invasion was unsuccessful and in 250 BC, after Magas' death, the city was reabsorbed into Ptolemaic Egypt. Cyrenaica became part of the Ptolemaic empire controlled from Alexandria, and became Roman territory in 96 BC when Ptolemy Apion bequeathed Cirenaica to Rome. In 74 BC the territory was formally transformed into a Roman province.

The archeological site lies near the village of Shahhat. One of its more significant features is the temple of Apollo which was originally constructed as early as the 7th century BC. Other ancient structures include a temple to Demeter and a partially unexcavated temple to Zeus. There is a large necropolis approximately 16 km between Cyrene and its ancient port Apollonia. The Cyrene Museum also lies on the site.

==== Other Interesting Sites ====
- Germa Old City Called the Libyan Lost City
- Tulmitha or Ptolemos is a Greek City established By Emperor Ptolemy I
- Giarabub Ancient Egyptian City in The Libyan Egyptian Border

=== Tripoli ===
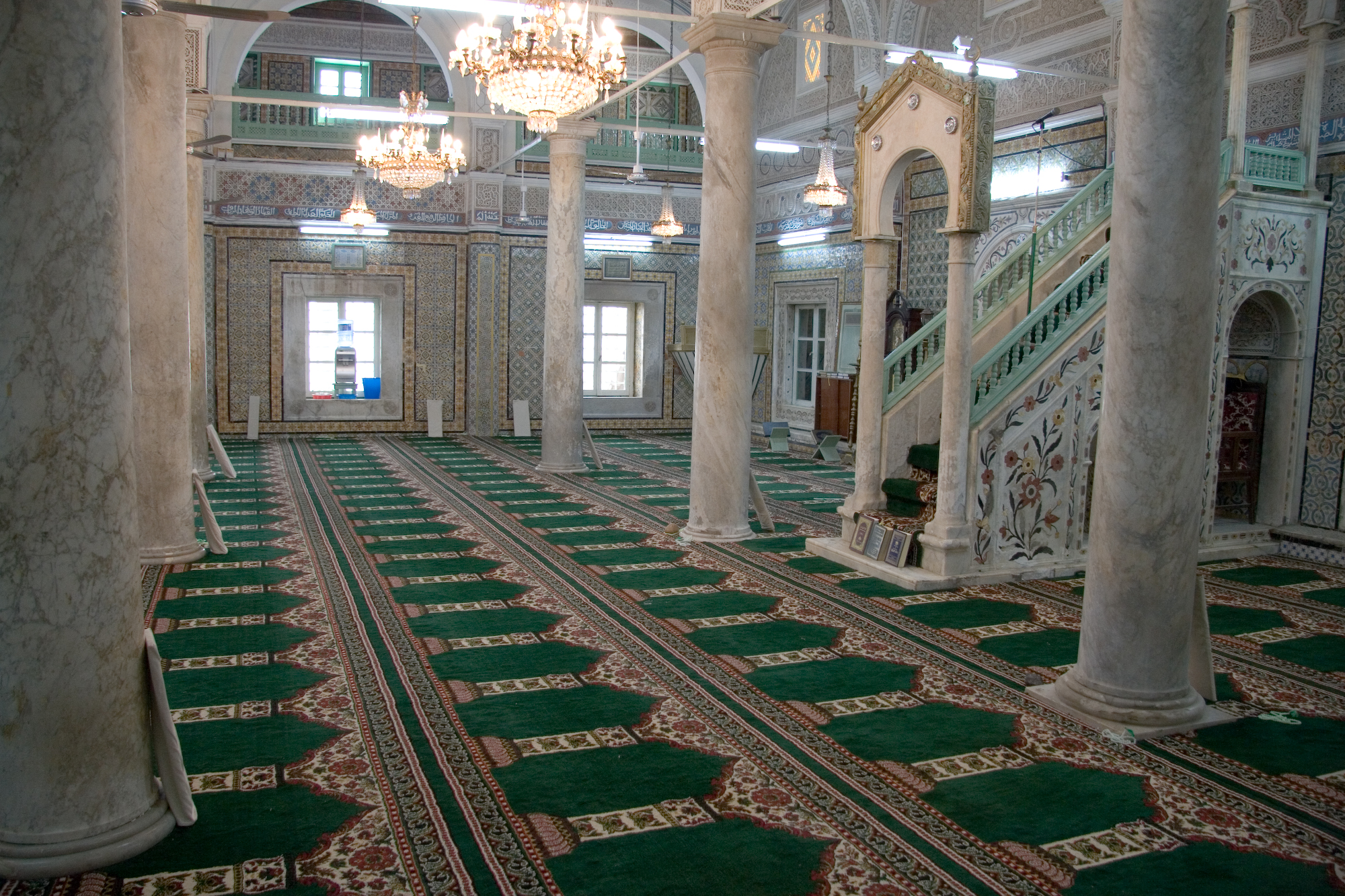
The inside of the Gurgi Mosque in the Tripoli Medina.

Tripoli is the de facto capital of Libya and was once known as the "White Bride of the Mediterranean". Throughout history, the city exchanged hands many times, and several historic mosques and other sites in the medina attest to this. The Turkish and Italian colonial periods left a distinctive mark on the city's architecture.

Easily the most dominant feature of Tripoli is the Red Castle of Tripoli, Assaraya al-Hamra, which sits on the northern promontory overlooking what used to be the sea – a motorway and 500 m (1640 ft) of reclaimed land now separate the two. The large structure comprises a labyrinth of courtyards, alleyways and houses built up over the centuries with a total area of around 13,000 square metres (140,000 sq ft). Inside, there is evidence of all the city's (and thus the citadel's) ruling parties: the Turks, Karamanlis, Spaniards, Knights of Malta, Italians and several others who all left their presence in its arts and architecture.

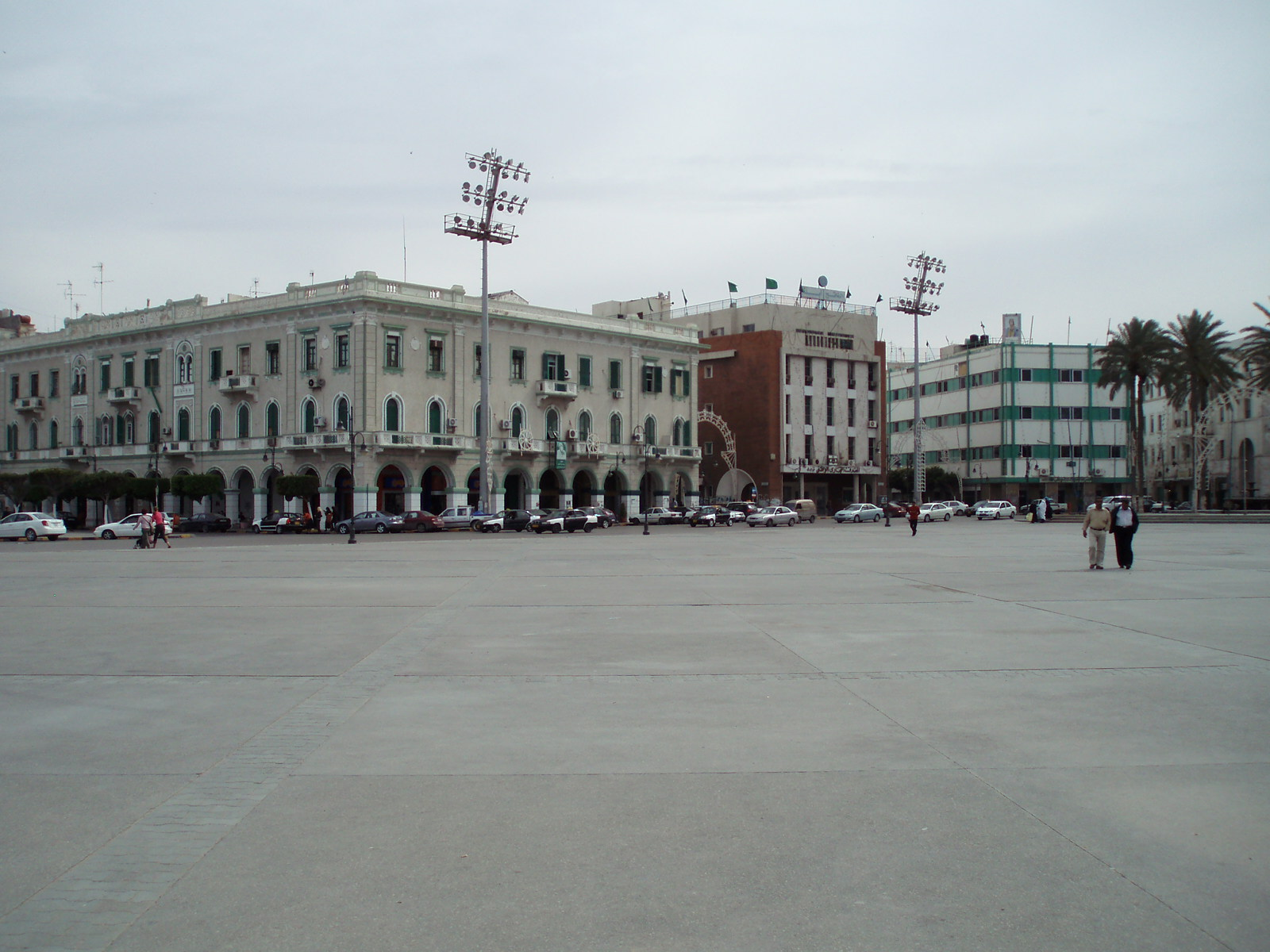
Martyr's Square in the heart of Tripoli is where the medina and the Italian quarter meet.

The entrance to the Jamahiriya Museum is on Martyr's Square, next to the castle. These facilities were built in consultation with UNESCO at enormous cost, and the exhibits within are laid out chronologically, starting with prehistory and ending up with the revolution. The most impressive parts are the mosaics, statues and artifacts from classical antiquity, which make up one of the best preserved collections in the Mediterranean.

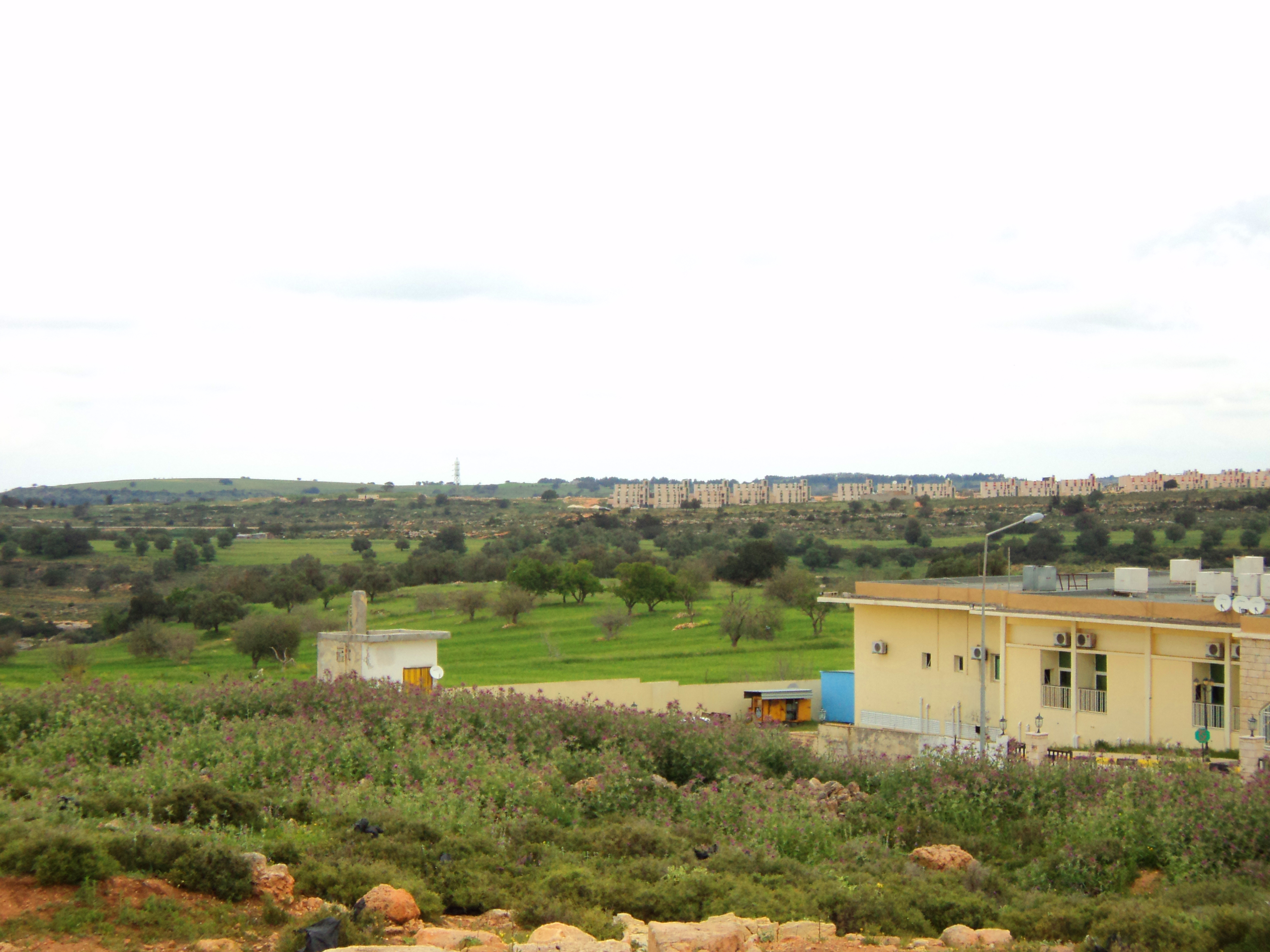
The outskirts of the city of Bayda, Eastern Libya.

The medina is the heart of Tripoli and provides the best sightseeing and shopping opportunities in the city for tourists. The basic street plan of the medina was laid down in the Roman period when the walls were constructed as protection against attacks from the interior of Tripolitania, and are considered well planned, possibly better than modern street plans. In the 8th century a wall on the sea-facing side of the city was added.

Three gates provided access to the old town: Bab Zanata in the west, Bab Hawara in the southeast and Bab Al-Bahr in the north wall; the city walls are still standing today. The bazaar is also known for its traditional ware; jewellery and clothes can be found in the local markets. Unlike neighbouring countries, Libya is known for its lack of hassle in the souqs. The old walled city also contains virtually all of Tripoli's historic mosques, khans (inns), hammams and houses. Other nearby attractions include the city's zoo and many of the nearby beaches.

Since the rise in tourism and influx of foreign businesspeople, there has been an increased demand for hotels in the city. To cater for these increased demands, the Corinthia Bab Africa hotel located in the central business district was constructed in 2003 and is the largest hotel in Libya. Other large hotels include the Bab El Bahr hotel and the Kabir Hotel as well as others.

=== Sahara Desert ===
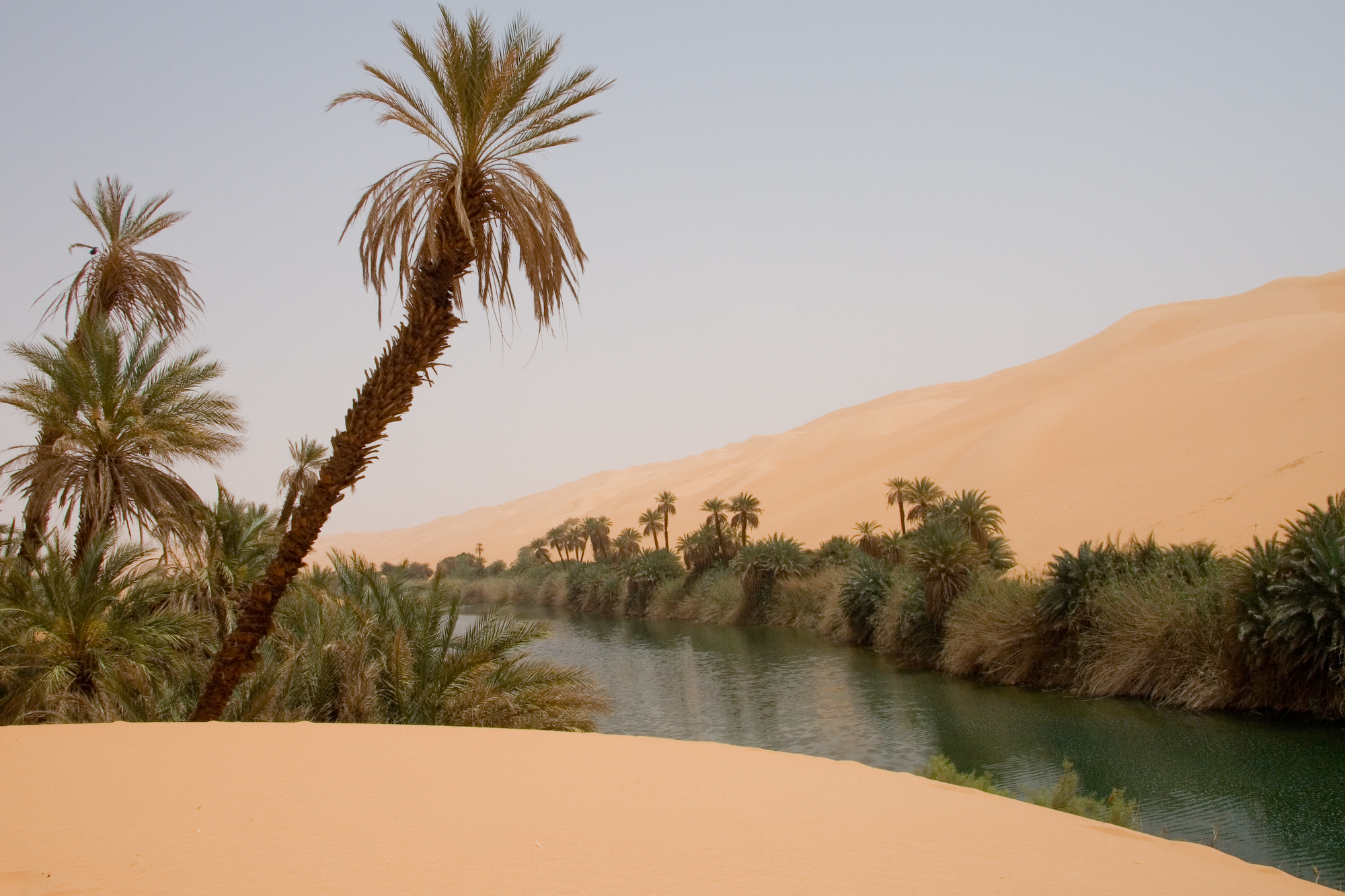
A lake in the Ubari Desert.

The Sahara Desert represents more than 92% of Libyan territory, more than any other North African country. This provided an important resource with many tourist attractions and landmarks. Highlights included the superb pre-historic rock art sites of the Acacus Mountains (contiguous with the Tassili n’Ajjer in adjacent Algeria) and the nearby Mesak Settafet escapement (Wadi Mathendous), Ottoman-era forts in Murzuk, the unique dune-ringed lakes of the Idehan Ubari Sand Sea and the nearby ruins of the Garamantes in the Wadi Eshati. Such diversity gave several opportunities for adventure tourists following the desert tracks. While the Sahara's natural beauty, calm, isolation was a destination in itself with rich photographic opportunities.

Independent tourism only emerged in the late 1990s when various, well-connected Libyan middlemen were able to obtain the necessary invite to apply for a visa in one's home country. Once at the border vehicles had to rent Libyan number plates and buy a locally issued temporary vehicle importation permit, similar to the Egyptian system, except that in Libya the documents were in Arabic and border personnel did not speak European languages so the services of a fixer were needed to clear the border.

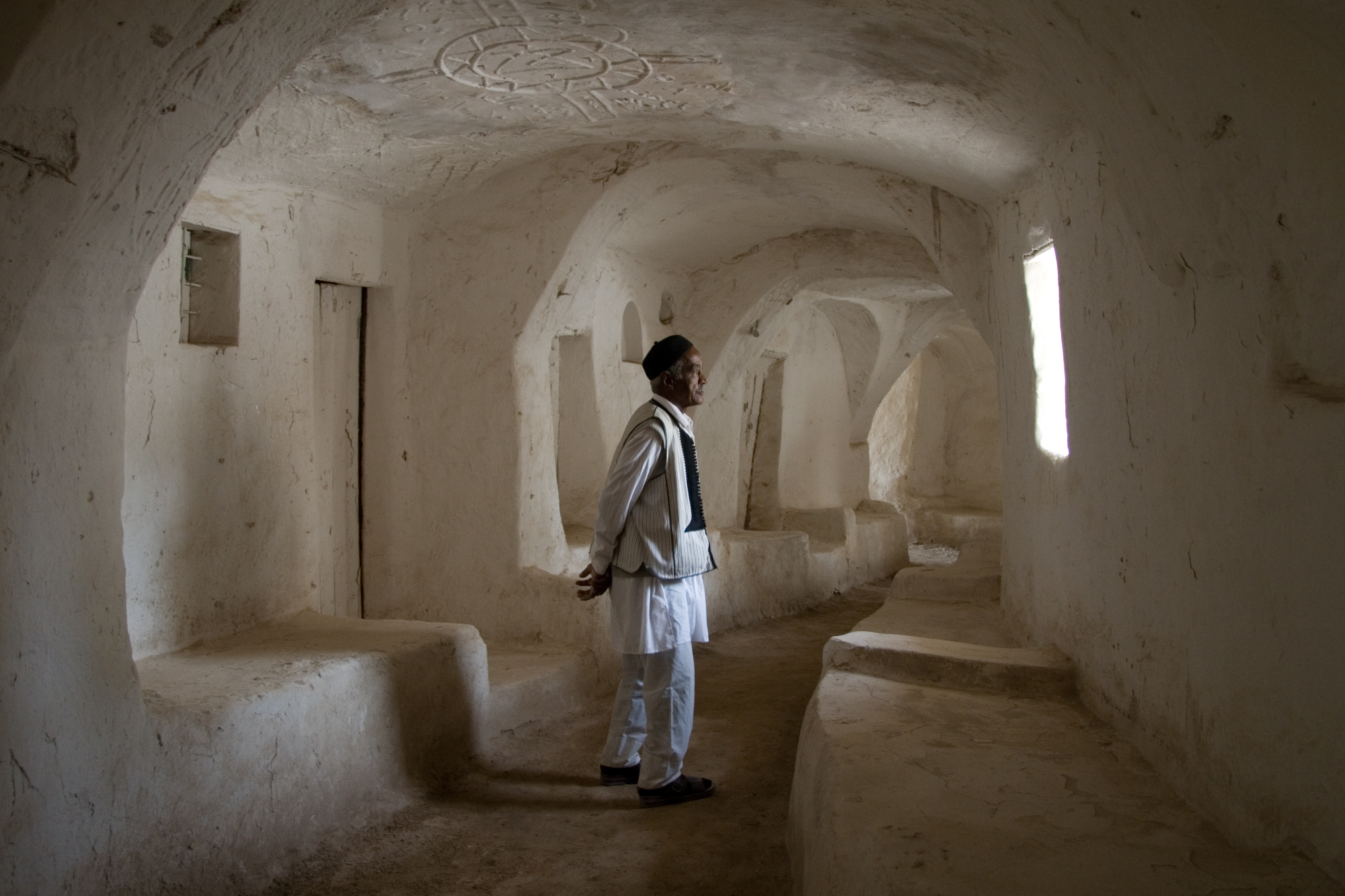
A Libyan dressed in traditional clothing in Ghadames.

Up to 2002 it was possible to travel in Libya without an expensive escort from a local tourist agency, but once on the road (and with black market currency bought near the border), fuel cost just a few pence a litre; among the cheapest in the world. In the days when this was possible, the remote desert town of Ghat in the far southwest of the Fezzan was the key destination for most travellers, accessed either along the 600-km border track south of Ghadames to Serdeles (Al Awaynat), across the Hamada el Hamra plateau to Idri, or for the intrepid few with a local guide, right through the Ubari Sand Sea to the Ubari–Ghat road along the Wadi Eshati.

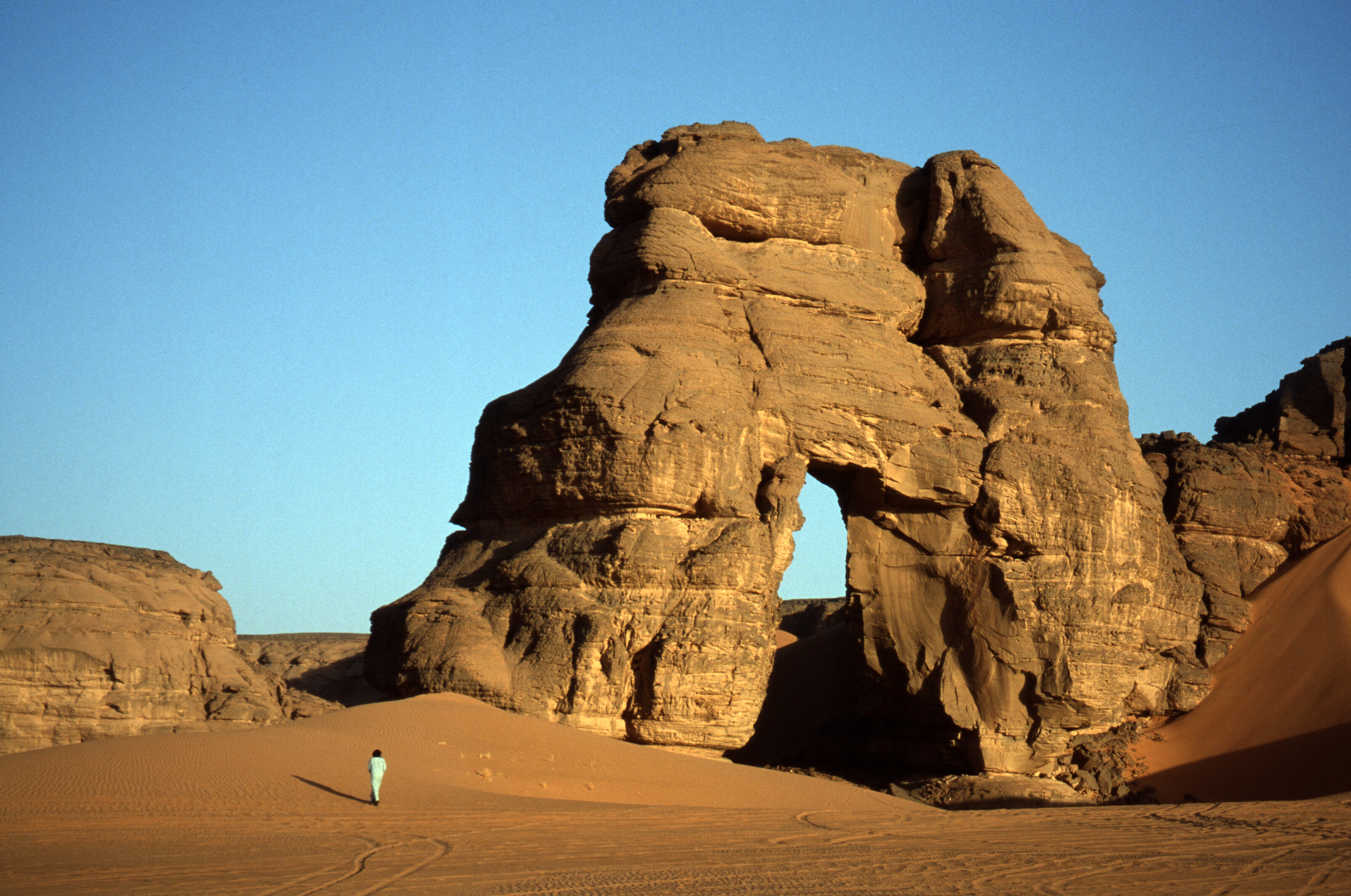
The famous arch on Route L3, KM96 in the Acacus Mountains.

By comparison, the Sahara of eastern Libya has fewer places of interest, other than getting there via an adventurous route. From Sabha, travellers could drive east to Waw an Namus volcanic crater, then continue through the Rebiana Sand Sea to Tazirbu for Kufra. A more southerly route passed a spur of the Tibesti Mountains (Jebel Nuqay or Dohone) via the Kilingue Pass, but landmines from the Chadian–Libyan conflict made this passage risky. Southeast of Kufra lay the massifs of Jabal Arkanu and Gabal El Uweinat straddling the borders of Egypt and Sudan. North of here the Calanshio Sand Sea, a western lobe of the Great Sand Sea to the east in Egypt) was rarely visited, with increasing risks of encountering WW2-era landmines as one neared Tobruk.

Most European desert tourists, either driving the own vehicles and entering Libya from Tunisia, or flying in to Tripoli for an escorted tour, had more than enough to fill their time visiting the spectacles of the Fezzan. At this time Libya was briefly a transit county for trans-Africa overlanders who crossed the country from Tunisia to Egypt. Exits into Sudan, Chad and Algeria were rare, although for a few years one could enter or exit Niger via Tumu along the so-called 'Marlboro Piste', a smugglers' route and the old trans-Sahara caravan route from the Kanem–Bornu Empire.

== Libyan cuisine ==
Libyan cuisine is generally simple, and is very similar to Sahara cuisine with several Ottoman/Turkish and Italian influences. In many undeveloped areas and small towns, restaurants may be nonexistent, and food stores may be the only source to obtain food products. Some common Libyan foods include couscous, bazeen, which is a type of unsweetened cake, and shurba, which is soup. Libyan restaurants may serve international cuisine, or may serve simpler fare such as lamb, chicken, vegetable stew, potatoes and macaroni. Alcohol consumption is illegal in the entire country.

There are four main ingredients of traditional Libyan food: olives (and olive oil), palm dates, grains and milk. Grains are roasted, ground, sieved and used for making bread, cakes, soups and bazeen. Dates are harvested, dried and can be eaten as they are, made into syrup or slightly fried and eaten with bsisa and milk. After eating, Libyans often drink mainly green and sometimes black tea. This is normally done in 3 rounds: 1st round without sugar or mint, 2nd round with sugar and mint (or sage), and 3rd round with the tea is served with roasted peanuts or roasted almonds (mixed with the tea in the same glass).

== See also ==
- Outline of Libya
