= International rankings of Libya =

Rankings of Libya internationally

These are the international rankings of Libya.

== Economy ==
- The Heritage Foundation/The Wall Street Journal 2009 Index of Economic Freedom ranked 171 out of 179

== Energy ==
- Energy Information Administration 2006 Oil Reserves ranked 9 out of 20

== Military ==
- Institute for Economics and Peace Global Peace Index ranked 46 out of 144

== Politics ==
- Reporters Without Borders 2009 Press Freedom Index ranked 156 out of 175
- Transparency International 2008 Corruption Perceptions Index ranked 126 out of 180
- Economist Intelligence Unit Shoe-Thrower's index ranked 2

== Society ==
- The Economist Quality-of-Life Index ranked 70 out of 111
- United Nations Development Programme: 2010 Human Development Index ranked 53 out of 169
