= List of World Heritage Sites in Libya =

Location of World Heritage Sites in Libya

The United Nations Educational, Scientific and Cultural Organization (UNESCO) World Heritage Sites are places of importance to cultural or natural heritage as described in the UNESCO World Heritage Convention, established in 1972. Cultural heritage consists of monuments (such as architectural works, monumental sculptures, or inscriptions), groups of buildings, and sites (including archaeological sites). Natural heritage consists of natural features (physical and biological formations), geological and physiographical formations (including habitats of threatened species of animals and plants), and natural sites which are important from the point of view of science, conservation, or natural beauty. Libya accepted the convention on 13 October 1978. There are five World Heritage Sites in Libya, with a further three on the tentative list.

The first three sites in Libya were added to the list in 1982 and the most recent one in 1986. All five are listed as cultural sites. In 2016, all five sites were listed on the List of World Heritage in Danger because of the instability caused by the Libyan civil war. In 2025, Ghadames was removed from the endangered list, due to extensive restoration efforts by local authorities and other partners.

== World Heritage Sites ==
UNESCO lists sites under ten criteria; each entry must meet at least one of the criteria. Criteria i through vi are cultural, and vii through x are natural.

† In danger

World Heritage Sites
Site	Image	Location (district)	Year listed	UNESCO data	Description
Archaeological Site of Leptis Magna†	Ruins of a Roman theater	Murqub	1982	183; iii, v vi (cultural)	Founded as a Phoenician settlement, Leptis Magna came under Roman rule in 46 BCE. It was the birthplace of Septimius Severus. After becoming Roman emperor in 193, he rebuilt and enlarged the city, making it one of the most beautiful cities of the Roman world. It is one of the best examples of Roman urban planning. It was pillaged in the 4th century, reconquered by the Byzantines, and abandoned following the Arab invasion. The ruins of the Roman theater are pictured.
Archaeological Site of Sabratha†	Ruins of a Roman-era theatre	Zawiya	1982	184; iii (cultural)	Founded as a Phoenician trading post, it became a part of the Kingdom of Massinissa. Sabratha was absorbed into the Roman province of Africa in 46 BCE. It prospered in the 2nd and 3rd centuries, during which numerous monuments were constructed, including a theatre with three levels of columns (pictured). The decline of the city began in the 4th century with the reduction in regional trade. In 455, the city was conquered by the Vandals. It later saw another stable period under the Byzantines, before the Arab invasions between the 7th and 11th centuries. It was ultimately abandoned after the Arab invasions.
Archaeological Site of Cyrene†	Ruins of a Greek temple	Jabal al Akhdar	1982	190; ii, iii, vi (cultural)	Cyrene was founded as a Greek colony of Thera in 631 BCE. It was a major city of the Hellenistic and, later, Roman worlds. It was heavily damaged during the Jewish revolt of 116 CE and rebuilt under Hadrian. Its decline began with the massive 365 Crete earthquake and tsunami that devastated the city. Monuments in the city include 6th- and 7th-century BCE Greek temples, Roman baths, a Greek theatre converted into a Roman one, and a Roman forum. The Temple of Zeus is pictured.
Rock-Art Sites of Tadrart Acacus†	Rock paintings depicting a giraffe and human figures	Ghat	1985	287; v (cultural)	The rock paintings and engravings in the Acacus Mountains were created from 12,000 BCE to 100 CE. They can be divided into distinct phases with different motifs and artistic styles. These phases reflect the changes in the local climate, flora, fauna, and way of life during and after the African humid period (12,000 BCE to 8000 BCE). The oldest paintings depict the large mammals of the savanna, such as giraffes and elephants, while later paintings focus on herds of cattle, horses, and dromedary camels of a desert climate.
Old Town of Ghadamès	Traditional white-washed buildings and a small square between houses	Nalut	1986	362; v (cultural)	The oasis town of Ghadamès is one of the oldest and most important cities of the Sahara. Occupied since at least the late 1st millennium BCE, it served as a hub of the trans-Saharan trade network. The town developed its own unique architectural style, adjusted to the harsh desert climate. A typical feature is the multi-storey house: the ground floor is for storage, the next floor is living space, and the open terraces are for the use of women. Ghadamès has the nickname "the Pearl of the Desert" from Arab sources. It was listed on the List of World Heritage in Danger in 2016, due to the civil conflict, wildfires and torrential rain. In 2025, it was no longer considered by UNESCO to be endangered, due to extensive restoration efforts by local authorities and several partners.

== Tentative list ==
In addition to sites inscribed on the World Heritage List, member states can maintain a list of tentative sites that they may consider for nomination. Nominations for the World Heritage List are only accepted if the site was previously listed on the tentative list. Libya has three properties on its tentative list.

Tentative sites
Site	Image	Location (district)	Year listed	UNESCO criteria	Description
Archaeological site of Ghirza	Two Roman structures with columns	Misrata	2020	ii, iii (cultural)	The settlement of Ghirza was a part of the southern border of the Roman Empire, the Limes Tripolitanus, as organized by the Emperor Septimius Severus around 200 CE. The remains of the settlement are well-preserved, with civil buildings and numerous monuments remaining. Ghirza illustrates the adaptation of Roman engineering approaches to the local environment, such as water management. The findings in the two extensive necropolises demonstrate a dynamic cultural interchange between the Romans and the local populations.
The Archaeological Site of Ptolemais	Ancient ruins with standing columns	Marj	2020	ii, iii, iv (cultural)	Ptolemais was founded as a Greek colony in the 7th century BCE. It was one of the five cities that formed the Pentapolis of Cyrenaica. It flourished during the Hellenistic and, later, Roman periods and in the 4th century surpassed Cyrene, which was damaged by earthquakes. It was also an important Early Christian diocese. It continued to be inhabited until the 14th century. The remains of the city document the cohabitation of different faiths and cultures. Monuments from different time periods have been preserved. A prominent landmark is a Hellenistic tower-tomb.
Haua Fteah Cave	Some people in front of a large cave entrance	Derna	2020	ii, iii, iv (cultural)	The cave is an archaeological site with a 14-metre (46 ft) deep record spanning over 150,000 years. It includes traces of occupation by anatomically modern humans, stone flake tools from the Middle Paleolithic, stone blades from the Upper Paleolithic, and shows evidence of the transition to farming 10,000–7000 years ago. It also provides a record of the climate in the region, including the periods of humid interglacial climate (the "green Sahara"), which allowed people to cross what is today a desert.
