= Military history of Libya =

The military history of Libya covers the period from the ancient era to the modern age.

== Classical Era ==
In ancient times, the Phoenicians and Carthaginians, the armies of Alexander the Great and his Ptolemaic successors from Egypt, then Romans, Vandals, and local representatives of the Byzantine Empire ruled all or parts of Libya. The territory of modern Libya had separate histories until Roman times, as Tripolitania and Cyrenaica.

== Roman Empire ==
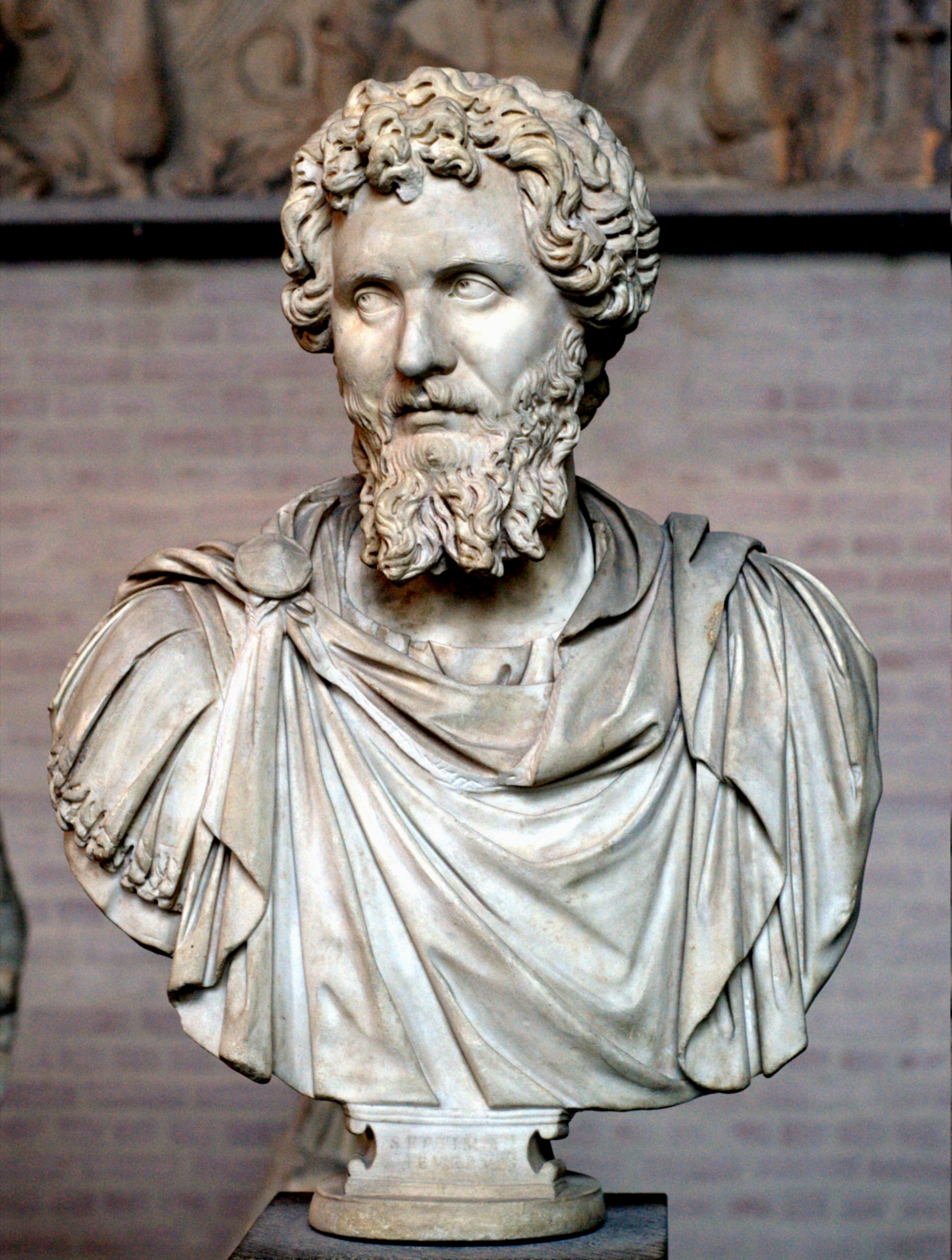
Roman Emperor Septimius Severus was born in Roman Libya

In the time of Julius Caesar the Romans united for the first time what later became Libya. Their legions dominated the North Africa area and brought five centuries of relative peace and progress to coastal Libya.

Roman influence was huge in Tripolitania, where the main city (Leptis Magna) was home to one of the most illustrious Roman Emperors, Septimius Severus.

In those five centuries of Roman domination the area around Oea, Sabratha and Leptis Magna enjoyed good agriculture and commerce, and was defended by the Limes Tripolitanus.

Cyrenaica, by contrast, was Greek before it was Roman. It was also known as Pentapolis, the "five cities" being Cyrene (near the village of Shahhat) with its port of Apollonia (Susa), Arsinoe (Taucheira), Berenice (Benghazi) and Barca (Marj). From the oldest and most famous of the Greek colonies the fertile coastal plain took the name of Cyrenaica.

The Legio III Augusta was in control of coastal Libya during the Roman Empire, and by the third century was made partially of Libyan natives. Romans, in order to defend coastal Libya, made war against the Garamantes (living in actual Fezzan) and made expeditions to the desert area south of Libya.

== Late Antiquity and Islamic conquest ==
Cyrenaica remained under East Roman (Byzantine) control, while Tripolitania fell under the Vandals in the mid-5th century. The Byzantines conquered the Vandal Kingdom in the Vandalic War of 533–534, including Tripolitania. The province was plagued over the next two decades by warfare between the Byzantines and the local Berber tribes, most notably the Leuathae. The Berbers were subdued however by John Troglita in the 540s.

As part of the Muslim conquest of Egypt, Cyrenaica was conquered in 642, and in 643 the Arabs took the eastern parts of Tripolitania and sacked Tripoli. In 647 an army of 20,000, led by Abdallah ibn Sa'ad, penetrated into western Tripolitania and Tunisia. In a 15-month campaign, the Arabs raided the Exarchate of Carthage and defeated and killed its ruler, Gregory. The campaign was intended as a raid rather than for conquest, however, and Ibn Sa'ad's force returned to Egypt after Gregory's successor Gennadius gave them a huge tribute in gold.

== Spanish and Ottoman Conquest ==
By the 15th century Libya was a haven for pirates. Habsburg Spain occupied Tripoli in 1510. Because the Spaniards were concerned with controlling the port instead of administering a colony, Charles V took Tripoli and in 1528 gave it to the Knights of St John of Malta.

In 1538 Tripoli was reconquered by a pirate king called Khair ad-Din and the coast became renowned as the Barbary Coast. The Ottomans arrived to occupy Tripoli in 1551, they saw little reason to rein in the region. It would be more than two centuries before the pirates' control of the region was challenged.

== Barbary Wars ==
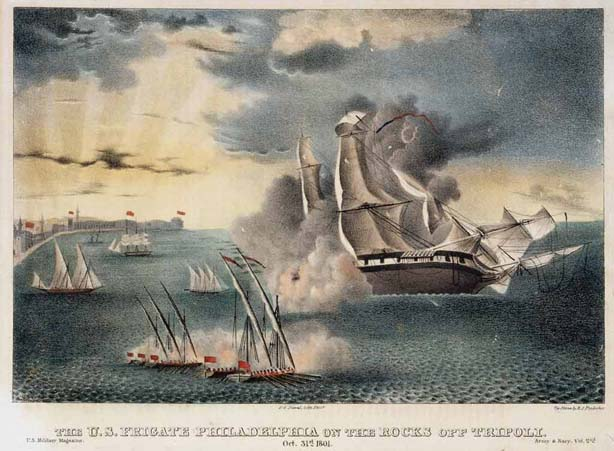
Philadelphia aground off Tripoli, in 1803.

The First and Second Barbary Wars were a series of military conflicts between the North African States and the United States. The sovereign authorities in these states demanded that all ships crossing or using their harbors pay duties and tax when traveling in their sovereign waters in the Mediterranean Sea. When the United States refused to pay, merchant vessels were seized by local Tripolitanian authorities and their crews were held for trial for trespassing.

The United States government responded by deploying its navy to region along with the Marines to combat the North African state of Tripolitania. This was the first overseas conflict of the United States. Both the Barbary Wars resulted in American victories. Some Libyans claim "victory" as the ship USS Philadelphia (1799) was deceived and lured, then captured by Libyans. They cite continued harbor duty payments as evidence. The USS Philadelphia (1799) stayed until 1804 when the matter was resolved.

== Italo-Turkish War ==
The Italo-Turkish War was a Colonial War fought between the Ottoman Empire and Italy from 29 September 1911 to 18 October 1912. Italy seized the Ottoman provinces of Tripolitania and Cyrenaica, together forming what (later in 1934) became known as Libya.

Some Libyans believe that the Ottoman Empire "sold" Libya at the treaty of Lousanne in order to survive a few years more. Libyan resistance was fierce and one of the top leaders was Sa'adon Al Swehli, but some Libyans fought on the Italian side.

== Resistance against Italy ==
After the Italian victory, Omar Mukhtar organized and devised strategies for the Libyan resistance against the Italian colonization. Mukhtar was skilled in desert tactics. He knew his country's geography and used that knowledge to his advantage in battles against the Italians. Mukhtar led his guerrilla fighters in some successful attacks against the Italians. His twenty-year struggle came to an end when he was wounded in battle and captured by the Italian army with the help of Libyan colonial troops. Mukhtar was tried, convicted, and sentenced to be executed by hanging in a public place.

Italian forces were able to erase the remaining resistance and even create the Italian Libyan Colonial Division with native Libyans, that fought for Italy in the 1936 conquest of Ethiopia and received a "Gold Medal of Honor" for distinguished performance in battle. Other Libyan forces in the Italian Army included the Savari.

== World War II ==
More than 30,000 Libyans fought in the Italian Army from 1940 to 1943. There were two divisions of Arab-Berber troops (1st Libyan Division, 2nd Libyan Division) that fought in World War II for the Fourth Shore of Italy. Even a battalion of Arab Libyan paratroopers was raised shortly before World War II, the first force of this kind to be created in all Africa. They trained in Castel Benito, near Tripoli, where the first "Italian Military Parachute School" was located (the first troops trained were two Libyan battalions, the Libyan Parachute Battalion and the 1st National Libyan Parachute Battalion, of the Regio Corpo Truppe Coloniali della Libia (Royal Colonial Corps).

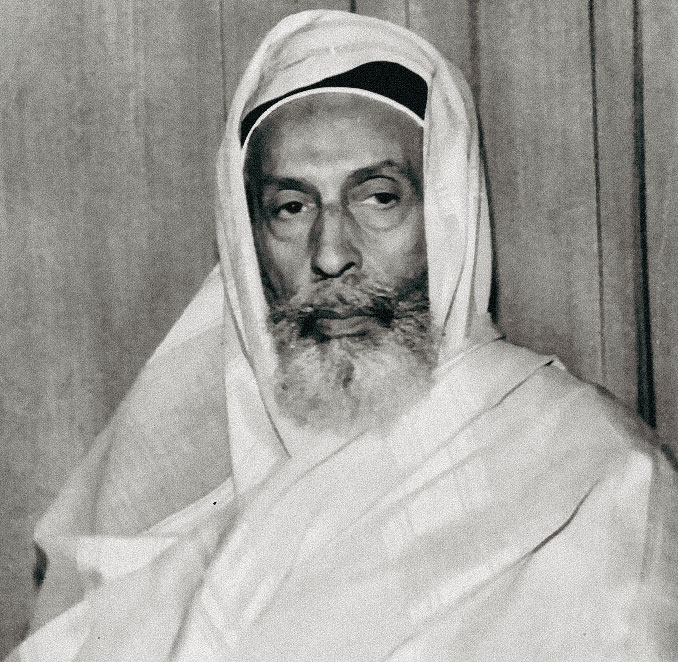
King Idris I on the cover of the Libyan Al Iza'a magazine, August 15, 1965

During World War II, the Senussi Idris supported the United Kingdom and brought some Cyrenaican nationalists to support the Allies against the Axis, which had occupied Libya. With the defeat of the German-Italian Army under Erwin Rommel, Idris was able to return to Benghazi: in 1951 was proclaimed King of Libya.

== Coup d'etat ==
To the chagrin of Arab nationalists at home and supporters of Pan-Arabism in neighbouring states, King Idris maintained close ties with the United Kingdom and the United States, even after they intervened against Egypt during the 1956 Suez Crisis

On 1 September 1969, a small group of military officers led by Muammar Gaddafi staged a coup against King Idris. The new regime headed by the Revolutionary Command Council (RCC), abolished the monarchy and proclaimed Libya a republic.

== Yom Kippur War ==
The 1973 Yom Kippur War was the fourth major conflict between Israel and the neighboring Arab States. Libya was among the many Arab nations to contribute to the war with both military and financial aid. During the Yom Kippur War, Libya sent squadrons of Mirage fighters and gave Egypt around $1 billion in arms.

== Libyan-Egyptian War ==
The Libyan-Egyptian War was a border war between Libya and Egypt in July 1977. Tensions between the two countries had increased during April and May as demonstrators attacked the embassies of both countries. On 21 July 1977 gun battles between troops on the border began, followed by land and air attacks. A ceasefire was agreed to on 24 July. Libyan casualties were 400 dead or wounded while Egyptian casualties were 100 dead or wounded.

== Uganda-Tanzania War ==
During the 1978 Uganda-Tanzania War, Muammar Gaddafi sent 3,000 troops to aid Idi Amin's government. However the Libyans soon found themselves on the front line, while behind them Uganda Army units were using supply trucks to retreat. Tanzanian and UNLA forces met little resistance and invaded Uganda.

== Gulf of Sidra Incident ==
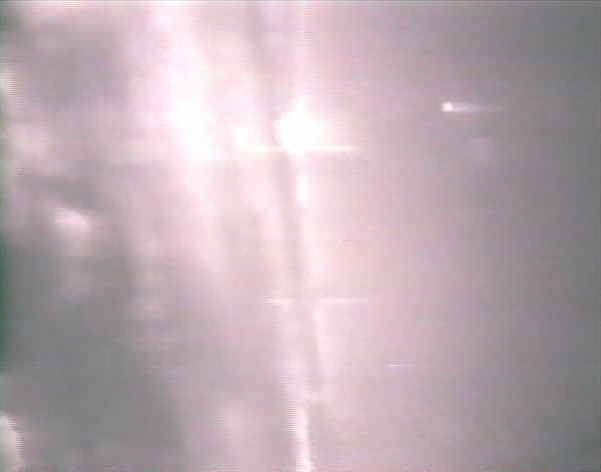
The lead F-14 has just destroyed the last remaining MiG-23

In the Gulf of Sidra incidents, fighters from the United States Navy F-14 Tomcats engaged in combat against fighters from the Libyan Air Force. During both events the United States Navy F-14 Tomcats defeated the Libyan Air Force.

In the first Gulf of Sidra incident, two United States Navy F-14 Tomcats from the USS Nimitz engaged and shot down two Libyan Su-22s off of the Libyan coast.

The second Gulf of Sidra incident occurred in 1989 when two United States Navy F-14 Tomcats shot down two Libyan MiG-23s that appeared to be attempting to engage them.

== Chadian-Libyan conflict ==
The Chadian-Libyan conflict was related to the possession of the Aouzou Strip and was marked by a series of four separate Libyan interventions in Chad. Libyan leader Muammar Gaddafi had the support of a number of factions participating in the civil war.

The Chadian government had the support of the French, and rival Chadian factions who united against the Libyan army. In the final Toyota war Libya was defeated. According to American sources Libya lost 7,500 men and 1.5 billion dollars in military equipment.

== Second Congo War ==
The Second Congo War was a major conflict in Africa between 1998 and 2003. It was one of the bloodiest conflicts in modern history.

During the Second Congo War, Libya supported the Democratic Republic of the Congo by providing planes that transported soldiers from Chad to the region.

== 2011 Libyan civil war ==
For the 2011 conflict see 2011 Libyan civil war
