= List of mammals of Libya =

This is a list of the mammal species recorded in Libya. There are ninety-seven mammal species in Libya, of which three are critically endangered, one is endangered, five are vulnerable, and one is near threatened. Two of the species listed for Libya can no longer be found in the wild.

The following tags are used to highlight each species' conservation status as assessed by the International Union for Conservation of Nature:

EX	Extinct	No reasonable doubt that the last individual has died.
EW	Extinct in the wild	Known only to survive in captivity or as a naturalized populations well outside its previous range.
CR	Critically endangered	The species is in imminent risk of extinction in the wild.
EN	Endangered	The species is facing an extremely high risk of extinction in the wild.
VU	Vulnerable	The species is facing a high risk of extinction in the wild.
NT	Near threatened	The species does not meet any of the criteria that would categorise it as risking extinction but it is likely to do so in the future.
LC	Least concern	There are no current identifiable risks to the species.
DD	Data deficient	There is inadequate information to make an assessment of the risks to this species.

Some species were assessed using an earlier set of criteria. Species assessed using this system have the following instead of near threatened and least concern categories:

LR/cd	Lower risk/conservation dependent	Species which were the focus of conservation programmes and may have moved into a higher risk category if that programme was discontinued.
LR/nt	Lower risk/near threatened	Species which are close to being classified as vulnerable but are not the subject of conservation programmes.
LR/lc	Lower risk/least concern	Species for which there are no identifiable risks.

== Order: Macroscelidea (elephant shrews) ==
Often called sengi, the elephant shrews or jumping shrews are native to southern Africa. Their common English name derives from their elongated flexible snout and their resemblance to the true shrews.

- Family: Macroscelididae (elephant shrews)
  - Genus: Elephantulus
    - North African elephant shrew, Elephantulus rozeti LC

== Order: Hyracoidea (hyraxes) ==
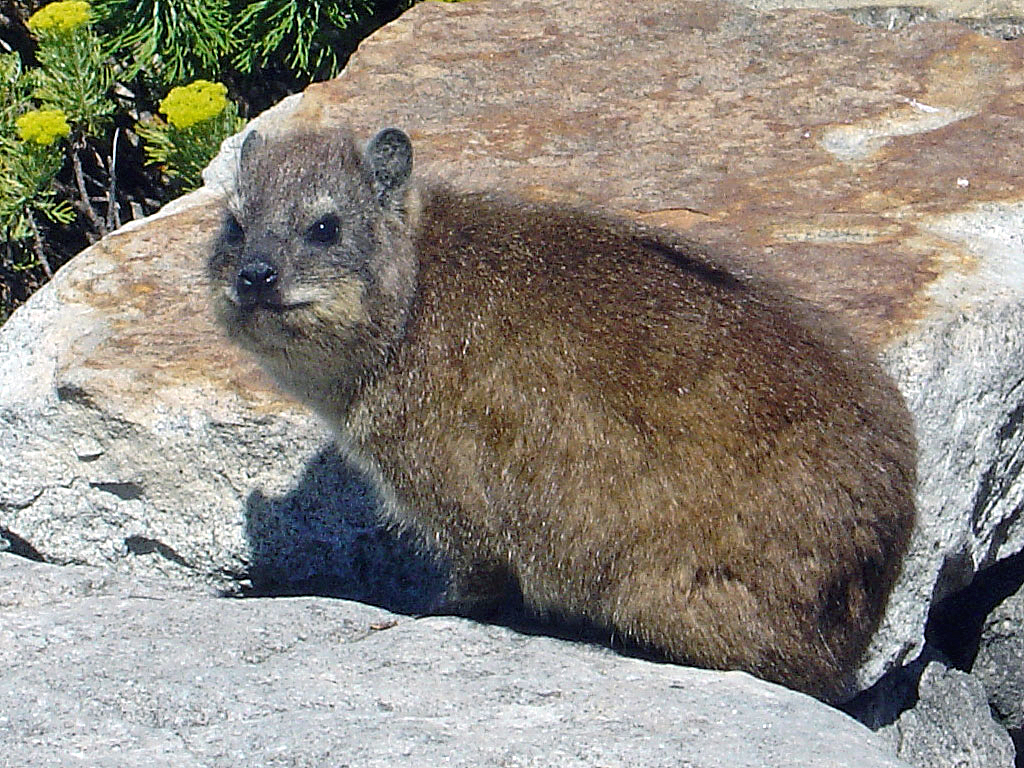
Cape hyrax

The hyraxes are any of four species of fairly small, thickset, herbivorous mammals in the order Hyracoidea. About the size of a domestic cat they are well-furred, with rounded bodies and a stumpy tail. They are native to Africa and the Middle East.

- Family: Procaviidae (hyraxes)
  - Genus: Procavia
    - Cape hyrax, Procavia capensis LC

== Order: Proboscidea (elephants) ==
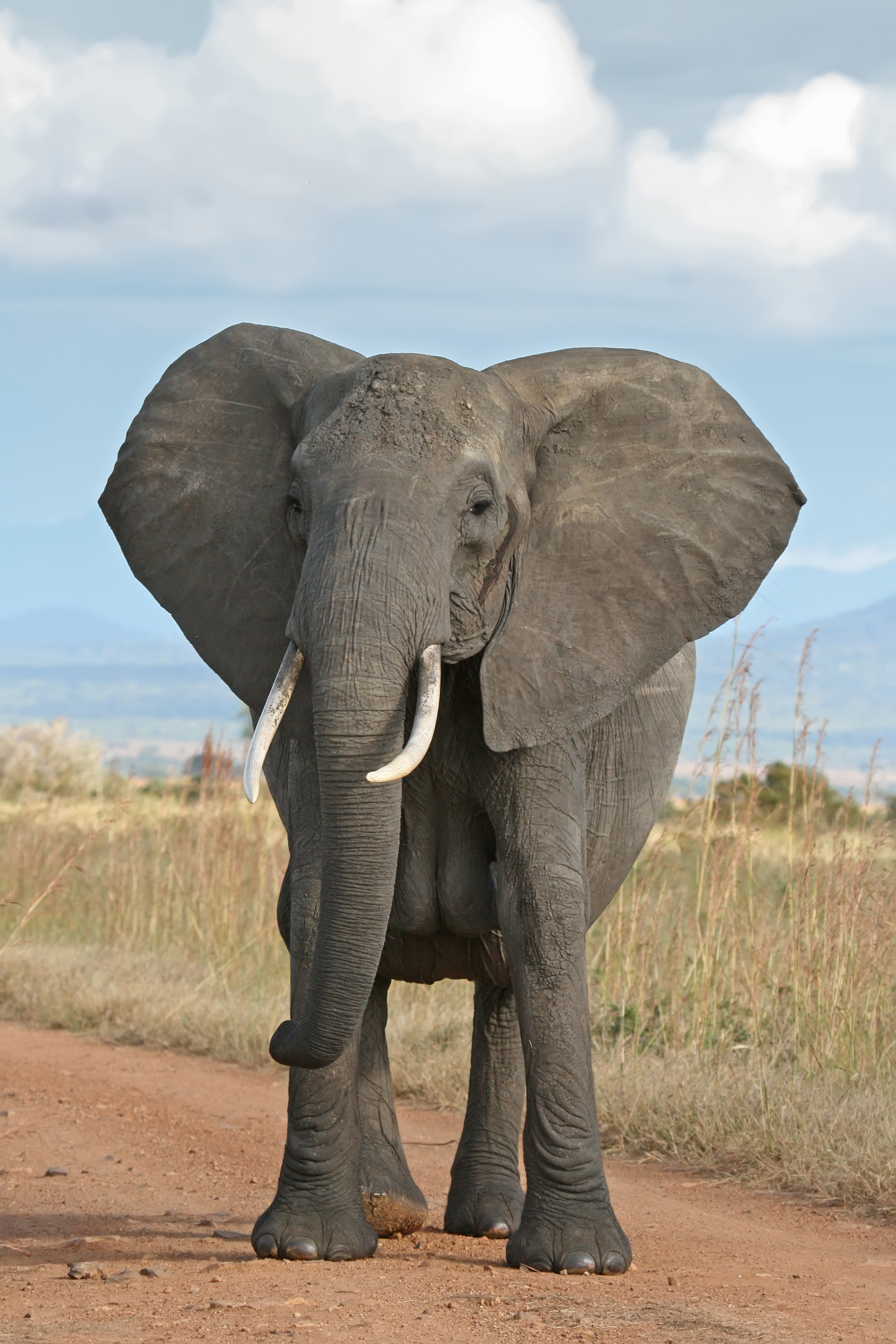
African bush elephant

The elephants comprise three living species and are the largest living land animals.

- Family: Elephantidae (elephants)
  - Genus: Loxodonta
    - African bush elephant, L. africana
      - North African elephant, L. a. pharaohensis extirpated

== Order: Primates ==
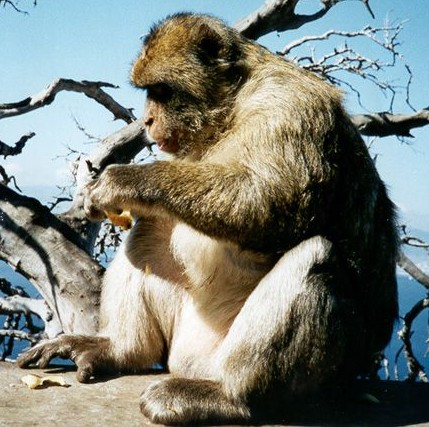
Barbary macaque

The order Primates contains humans and their closest relatives: lemurs, lorisoids, tarsiers, monkeys, and apes.

- Suborder: Haplorhini
  - Infraorder: Simiiformes
    - Parvorder: Catarrhini
      - Superfamily: Cercopithecoidea
        - Family: Cercopithecidae
          - Genus: Macaca
            - Barbary macaque, Macaca sylvanus EN

== Order: Rodentia (rodents) ==
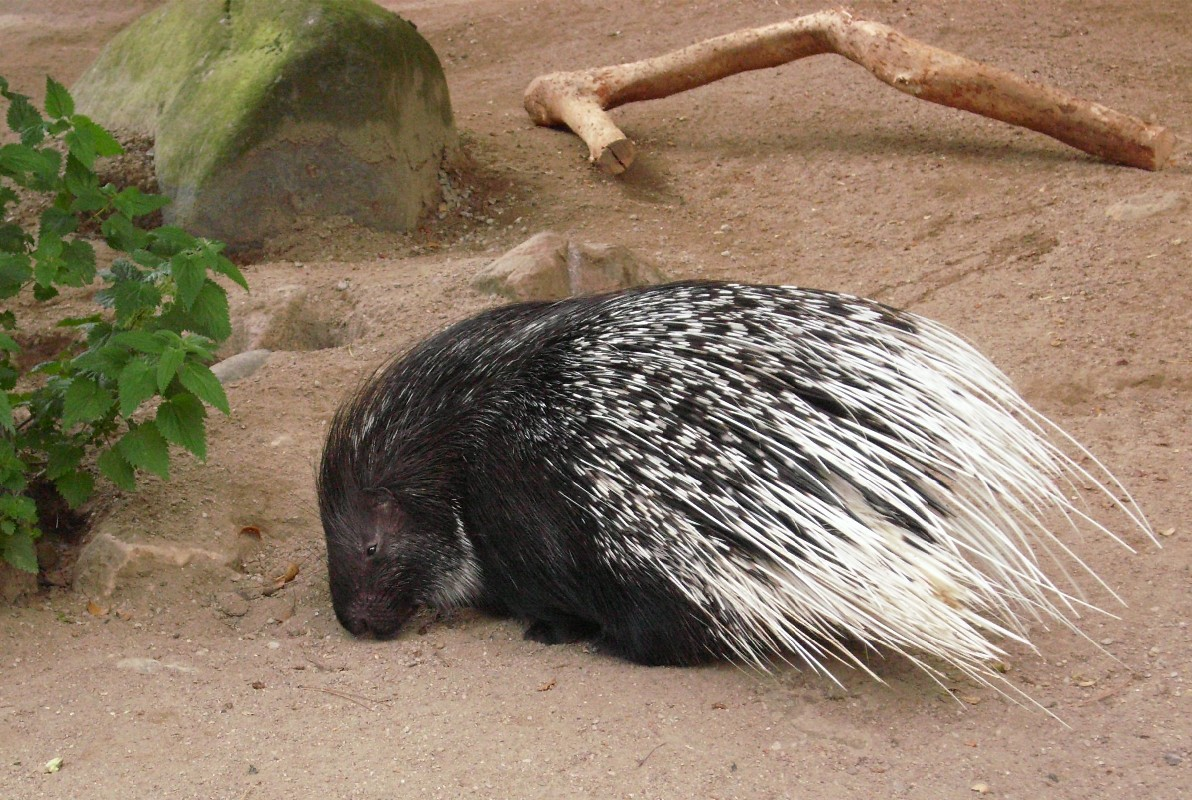
Crested porcupine

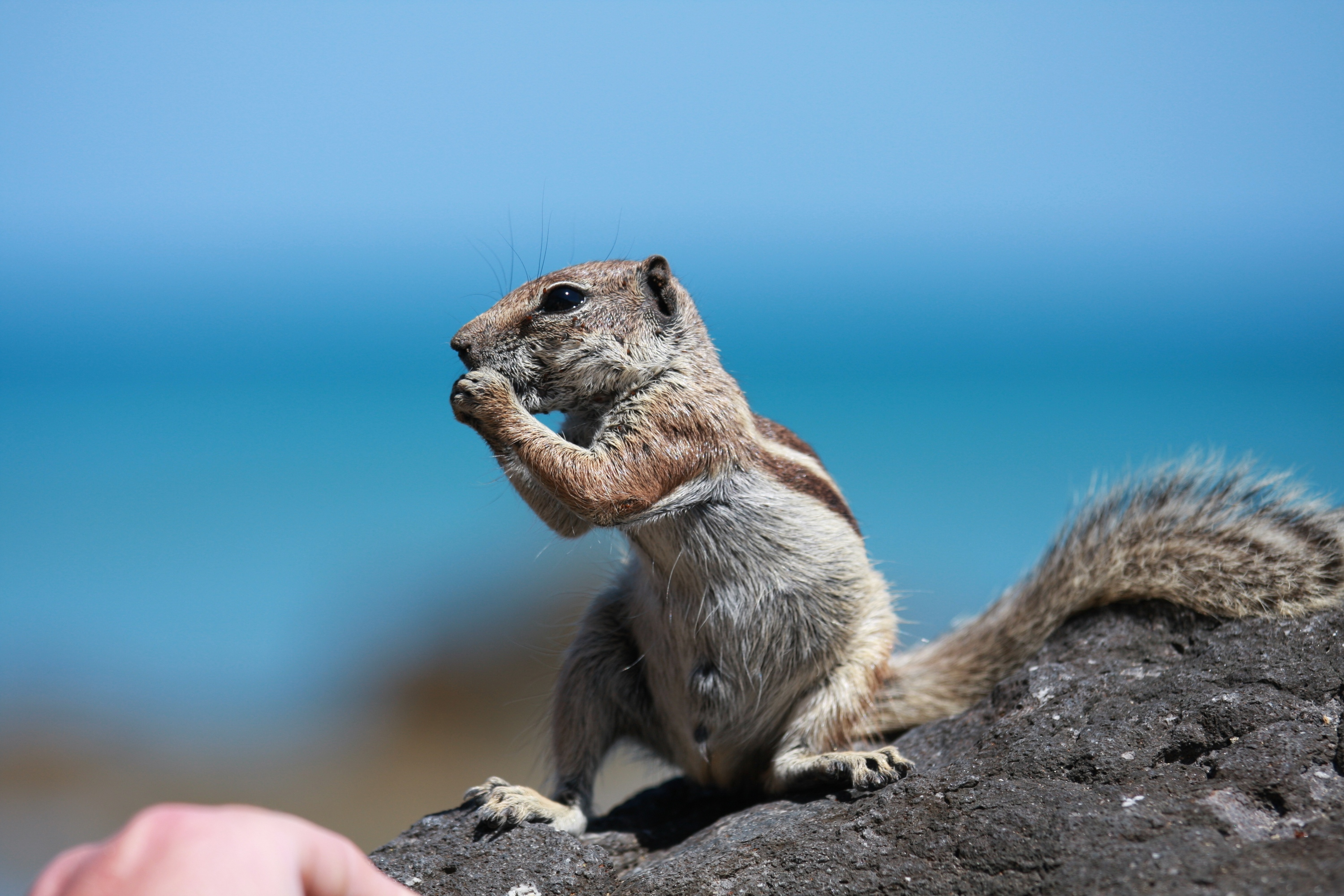
Barbary ground squirrel

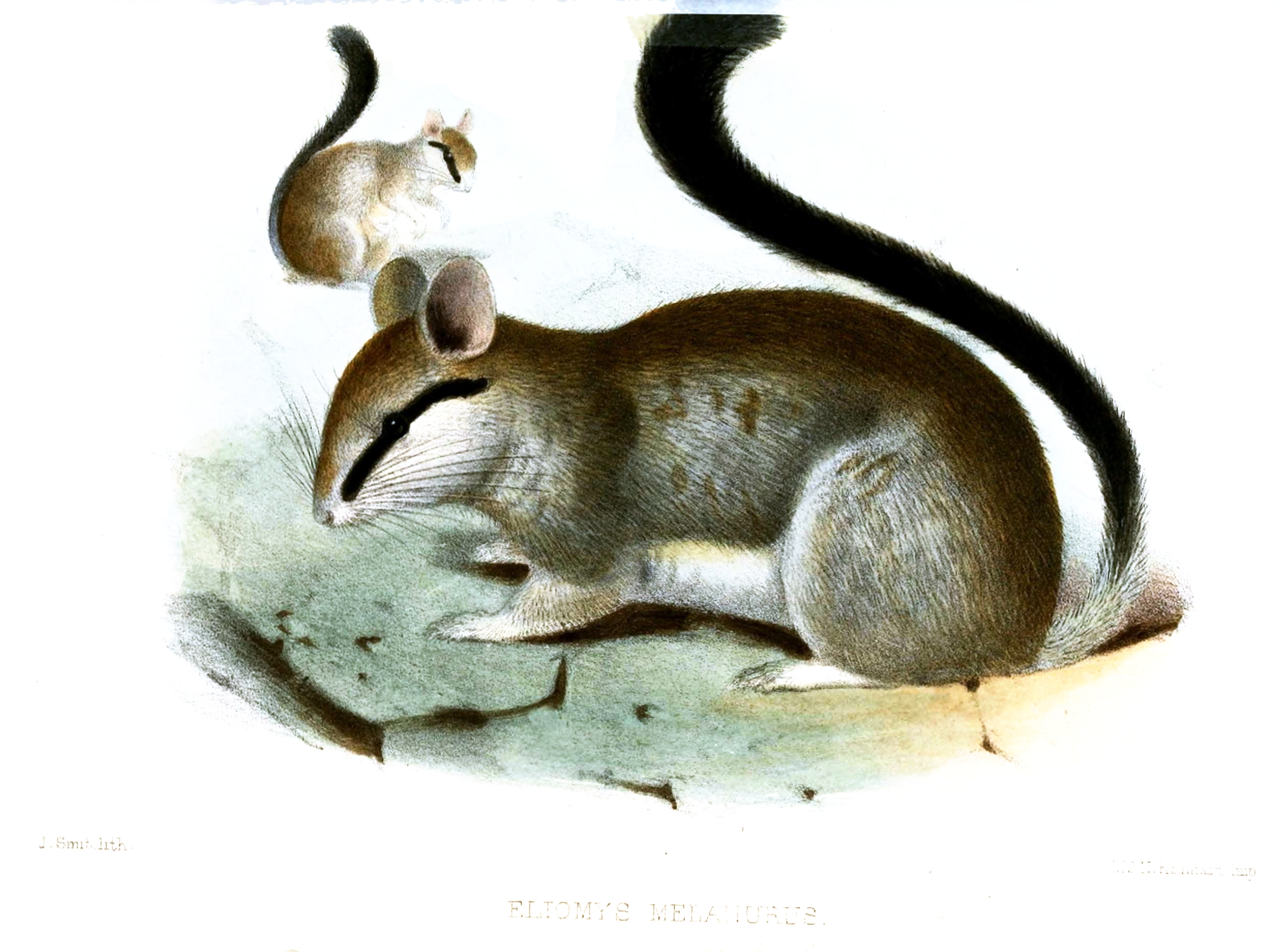
Asian garden dormouse

Rodents make up the largest order of mammals, with over 40% of mammalian species. They have two incisors in the upper and lower jaw which grow continually and must be kept short by gnawing.

- Suborder: Hystricognathi
  - Family: Hystricidae (Old World porcupines)
    - Genus: Hystrix
      - Crested porcupine, Hystrix cristata LC
- Suborder: Sciurognathi
  - Family: Sciuridae (squirrels)
    - Subfamily: Xerinae
      - Tribe: Xerini
        - Genus: Atlantoxerus
          - Barbary ground squirrel, Atlantoxerus getulus LC
- Suborder: Sciurognathi
  - Family: Gliridae (dormice)
    - Subfamily: Leithiinae
      - Genus: Eliomys
        - Asian garden dormouse, Eliomys melanurus LC
  - Family: Dipodidae (jerboas)
    - Subfamily: Allactaginae
      - Genus: Allactaga
        - Four-toed jerboa, Allactaga tetradactyla DD
    - Subfamily: Dipodinae
      - Genus: Jaculus
        - Lesser Egyptian jerboa, Jaculus jaculus LC
        - Greater Egyptian jerboa, Jaculus orientalis LC
  - Family: Spalacidae
    - Subfamily: Spalacinae
      - Genus: Nannospalax
        - Middle East blind mole-rat, Nannospalax ehrenbergi LC
  - Family: Cricetidae
    - Subfamily: Arvicolinae
      - Genus: Microtus
        - Günther's vole, Microtus guentheri LC
  - Family: Muridae (mice, rats, voles, gerbils, hamsters, etc.)
    - Subfamily: Deomyinae
      - Genus: Acomys
        - Cairo spiny mouse, Acomys cahirinus LC
    - Subfamily: Gerbillinae
      - Genus: Dipodillus
        - North African gerbil, Dipodillus campestris LC
      - Genus: Gerbillus
        - Pleasant gerbil, Gerbillus amoenus DD
        - Anderson's gerbil, Gerbillus andersoni LR/lc
        - Lesser Egyptian gerbil, Gerbillus gerbillus LC
        - Grobben's gerbil, Gerbillus grobbeni DD
        - Pygmy gerbil, Gerbillus henleyi LC
        - Lataste's gerbil, Gerbillus latastei DD
        - Balochistan gerbil, Gerbillus nanus LC
        - Lesser short-tailed gerbil, Gerbillus simoni LC
        - Sand gerbil, Gerbillus syrticus DD
        - Tarabul's gerbil, Gerbillus tarabuli LC
      - Genus: Meriones
        - Sundevall's jird, Meriones crassus LC
        - Libyan jird, Meriones libycus LC
        - Shaw's jird, Meriones shawi LC
      - Genus: Pachyuromys
        - Fat-tailed gerbil, Pachyuromys duprasi LC
      - Genus: Psammomys
        - Sand rat, Psammomys obesus LC
        - Thin sand rat, Psammomys vexillaris DD
    - Subfamily: Murinae
      - Genus: Mus
        - Algerian mouse, Mus spretus LC
  - Family: Ctenodactylidae
    - Genus: Ctenodactylus
      - Gundi, Ctenodactylus gundi LC
      - Val's gundi, Ctenodactylus vali DD
    - Genus: Massoutiera
      - Mzab gundi, Massoutiera mzabi LC

== Order: Lagomorpha (lagomorphs) ==
The lagomorphs comprise two families, Leporidae (hares and rabbits), and Ochotonidae (pikas). Though they can resemble rodents, and were classified as a superfamily in that order until the early 20th century, they have since been considered a separate order. They differ from rodents in a number of physical characteristics, such as having four incisors in the upper jaw rather than two.

- Family: Leporidae (rabbits, hares)
  - Genus: Lepus
    - Cape hare, Lepus capensis LR/lc
    - African savanna hare, Lepus microtis LR/lc

== Order: Erinaceomorpha (hedgehogs and gymnures) ==
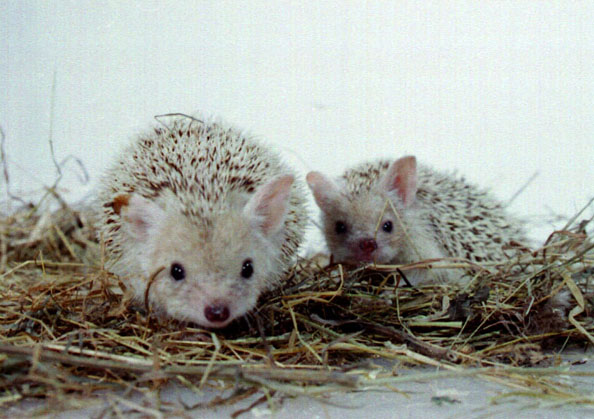
Long-eared hedgehog

The order Erinaceomorpha contains a single family, Erinaceidae, which comprise the hedgehogs and gymnures. The hedgehogs are easily recognised by their spines while gymnures look more like large rats.

- Family: Erinaceidae (hedgehogs)
  - Subfamily: Erinaceinae
    - Genus: Atelerix
      - North African hedgehog, Atelerix algirus LR/lc
    - Genus: Hemiechinus
      - Desert hedgehog, Hemiechinus aethiopicus LR/lc
      - Long-eared hedgehog, Hemiechinus auritus LR/lc

== Order: Soricomorpha (shrews, moles, and solenodons) ==
The "shrew-forms" are insectivorous mammals. The shrews and solenodons closely resemble mice while the moles are stout-bodied burrowers.

- Family: Soricidae (shrews)
  - Subfamily: Crocidurinae
    - Genus: Crocidura
      - Cyrenaica shrew, Crocidura aleksandrisi LC
    - Genus: Suncus
      - Etruscan shrew, Suncus etruscus LC

== Order: Chiroptera (bats) ==
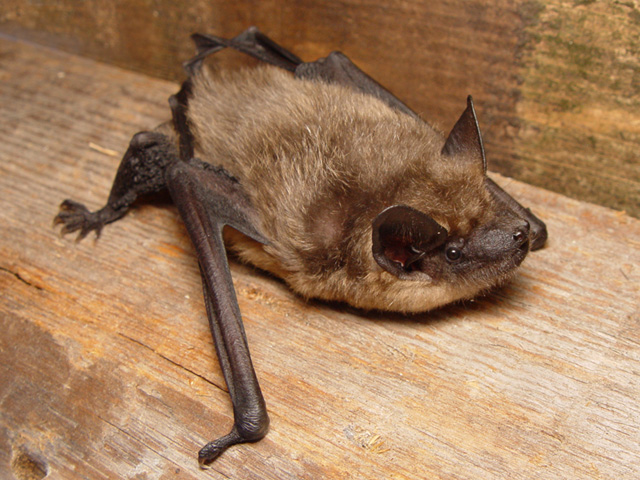
Serotine bat

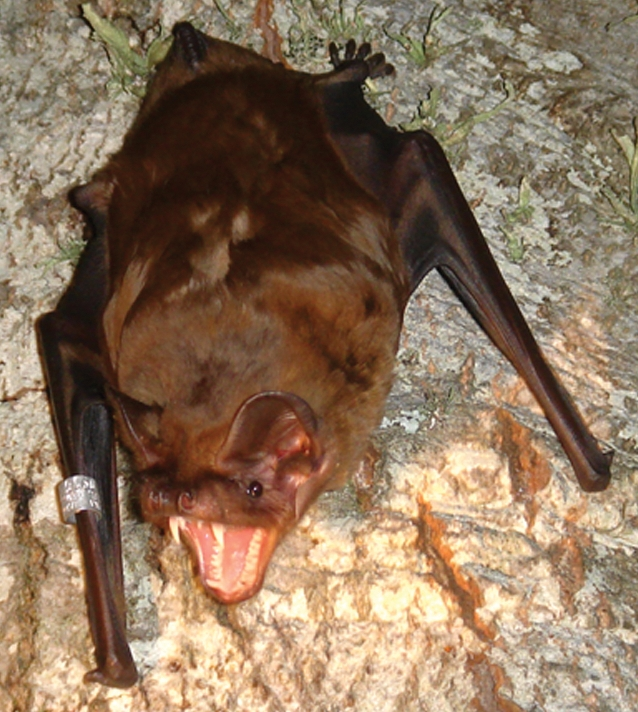
Greater noctule bat

The bats' most distinguishing feature is that their forelimbs are developed as wings, making them the only mammals capable of flight. Bat species account for about 20% of all mammals.

- Family: Pteropodidae (flying foxes, Old World fruit bats)
  - Subfamily: Pteropodinae
    - Genus: Rousettus
      - Egyptian fruit bat, Rousettus aegyptiacus LC
- Family: Vespertilionidae
  - Subfamily: Myotinae
    - Genus: Myotis
      - Felten's myotis, Myotis punicus DD
  - Subfamily: Vespertilioninae
    - Genus: Eptesicus
      - Serotine bat, Eptesicus serotinus LR/lc
    - Genus: Nyctalus
      - Greater noctule bat, Nyctalus lasiopterus LR/nt
      - Lesser noctule, Nyctalus leisleri LR/nt
    - Genus: Otonycteris
      - Desert long-eared bat, Otonycteris hemprichii LR/lc
    - Genus: Pipistrellus
      - Egyptian pipistrelle, Pipistrellus deserti LC
      - Kuhl's pipistrelle, Pipistrellus kuhlii LC
      - Common pipistrelle, Pipistrellus pipistrellus LC
      - Rüppell's pipistrelle, Pipistrellus rueppelli LC
    - Genus: Plecotus
      - Christie's big-eared bat, Plecotus christiei DD
      - Canary big-eared bat, Plecotus teneriffae DD
  - Subfamily: Miniopterinae
    - Genus: Miniopterus
      - Common bent-wing bat, Miniopterus schreibersii LC
- Family: Rhinopomatidae
  - Genus: Rhinopoma
    - Egyptian mouse-tailed bat, R. cystops LC
    - Lesser mouse-tailed bat, Rhinopoma hardwickei LC
    - Greater mouse-tailed bat, Rhinopoma microphyllum LC
- Family: Nycteridae
  - Genus: Nycteris
    - Egyptian slit-faced bat, Nycteris thebaica LC
- Family: Rhinolophidae
  - Subfamily: Rhinolophinae
    - Genus: Rhinolophus
      - Geoffroy's horseshoe bat, Rhinolophus clivosus LC
      - Mehely's horseshoe bat, Rhinolophus mehelyi VU
  - Subfamily: Hipposiderinae
    - Genus: Asellia
      - Trident leaf-nosed bat, Asellia tridens LC

== Order: Cetacea (whales) ==
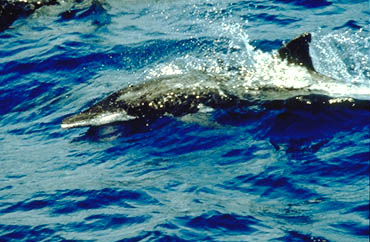
Rough-toothed dolphin

The order Cetacea includes whales, dolphins and porpoises. They are the mammals most fully adapted to aquatic life with a spindle-shaped nearly hairless body, protected by a thick layer of blubber, and forelimbs and tail modified to provide propulsion underwater.

Species listed below also includes species being recorded in Levantine Sea.

- Suborder: Mysticeti
  - Family: Balaenopteridae
    - Genus: Balaenoptera
      - Common minke whale, Balaenoptera acutorostrata LC
      - Fin whale, Balaenoptera physalus EN
      - Blue whale, Balaenoptera m. musculus EN (possible)
    - Subfamily: Megapterinae
      - Genus: Megaptera
    - Humpback whale, Megaptera novaeangliae LC and CR (Arabian Sea population)
  - Family: Balaenidae
    - Genus: Eubalaena
      - North Atlantic right whale, Eubalaena glacialis CR (possible)
- Suborder: Odontoceti
  - Superfamily: Platanistoidea
    - Family: Delphinidae (marine dolphins)
      - Genus: Steno
        - Rough-toothed dolphin, Steno bredanensis DD
      - Genus: Delphinus
        - Short-beaked common dolphin, Delphinus delphis LR/lc
      - Genus: Orcinus
        - Orca, Orcinus orca LR/cd
      - Genus: Pseudorca
        - False killer whale, Pseudorca crassidens DD
      - Genus: Globicephala
        - Long-finned pilot whale, Globicephala melas LR/lc
      - Genus: Grampus
        - Risso's dolphin, Grampus griseus LC
      - Genus: Stenella
        - Striped dolphin, Stenella coeruleoalba DD
      - Genus Tursiops
        - Common bottlenose dolphin, Tursiops truncatus LC
    - Family Physeteridae (sperm whales)
      - Genus: Physeter
        - Sperm whale, Physeter catodon VU
  - Superfamily Ziphioidea (beaked whales)
    - Family Ziphidae
      - Genus: Ziphius
        - Cuvier's beaked whale, Ziphius cavirostris LC

== Order: Carnivora (carnivorans) ==
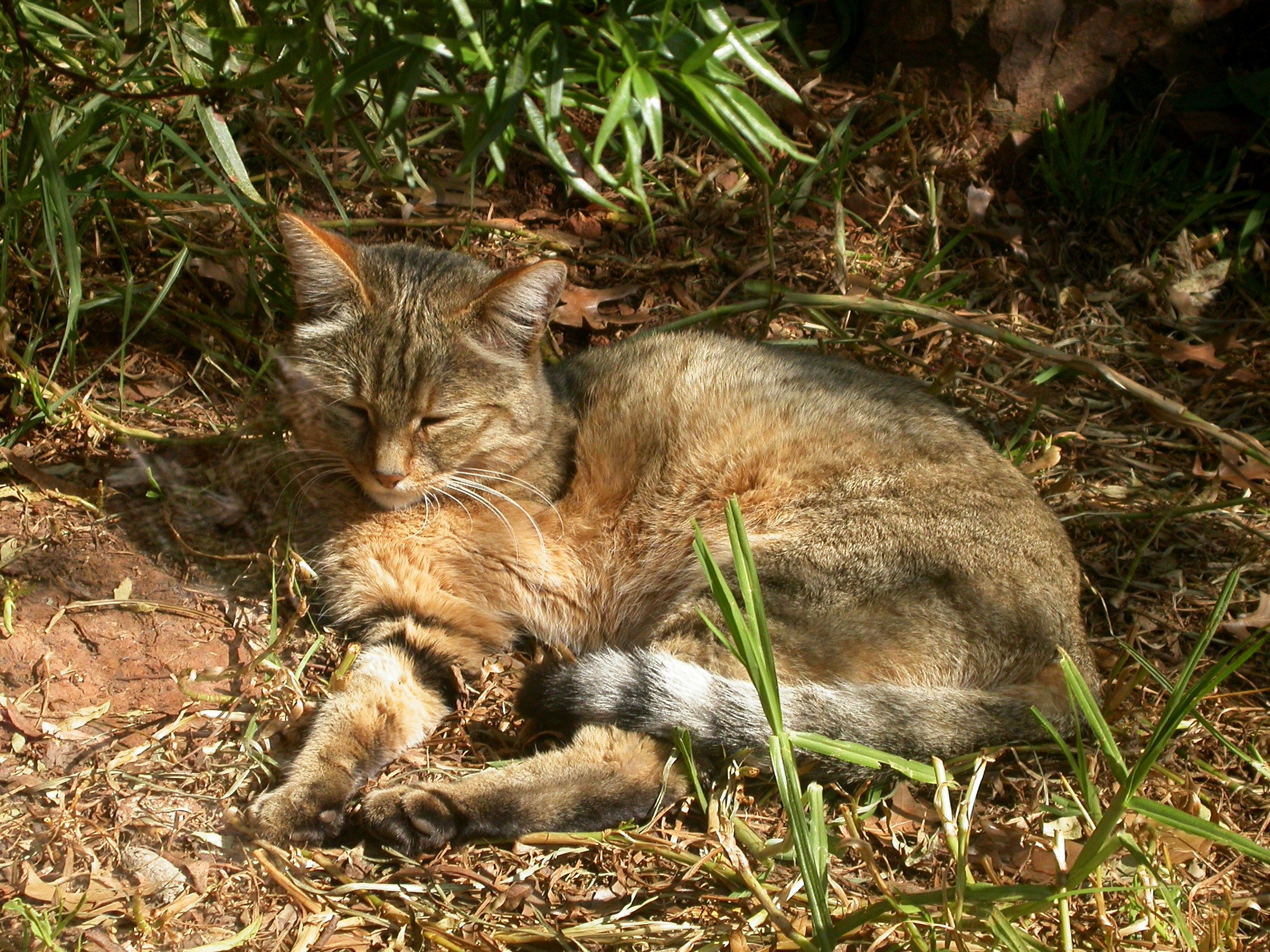
African wildcat

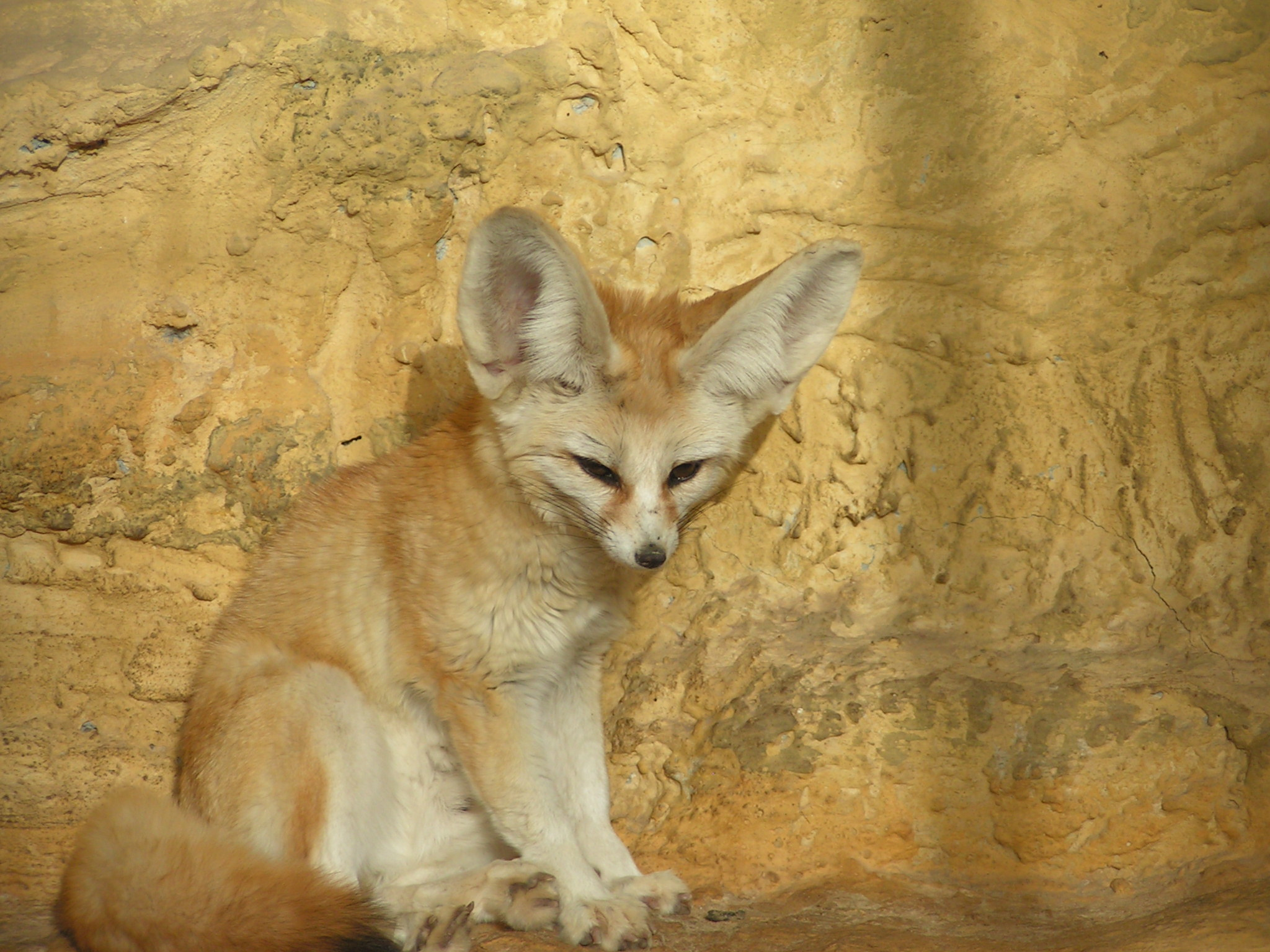
Fennec

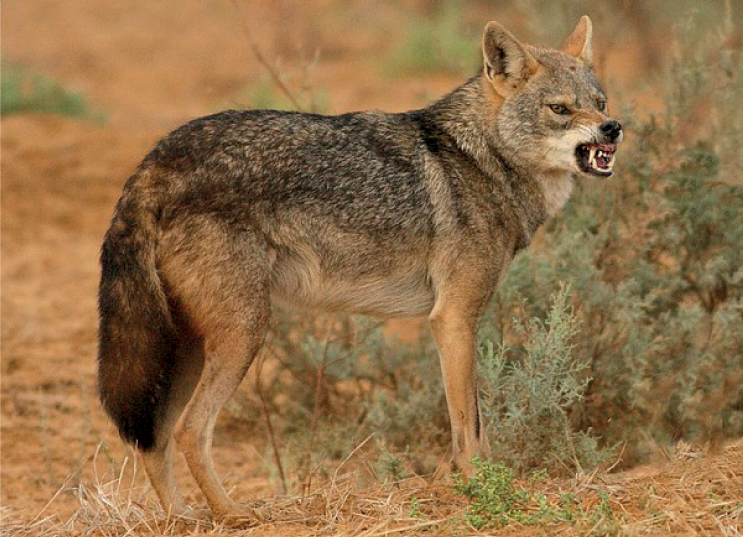
African golden wolf

There are over 260 species of carnivorans, the majority of which feed primarily on meat. They have a characteristic skull shape and dentition.

- Suborder: Feliformia
  - Family: Felidae (cats)
    - Subfamily: Felinae
      - Genus: Acinonyx
        - Cheetah, A. jubatus
          - Northwest African cheetah, A. j. hecki CR
      - Genus: Caracal
        - Caracal, Caracal caracal LC
      - Genus: Felis
        - African wildcat, F. lybica LC
        - Sand cat, Felis margarita NT
    - Subfamily: Pantherinae
      - Genus: Panthera
        - Leopard P. pardus VU extirpated
  - Family: Viverridae (civets, mongooses, etc.)
    - Subfamily: Viverrinae
      - Genus: Genetta
        - Common genet, Genetta genetta LC
  - Family: Herpestidae (mongooses)
    - Genus: Herpestes
      - Egyptian mongoose, Herpestes ichneumon LC
  - Family: Hyaenidae (hyaenas)
    - Genus: Hyaena
      - Striped hyena, Hyaena hyaena NT
- Suborder: Caniformia
  - Family: Canidae (dogs, foxes)
    - Genus: Canis
      - African golden wolf, Canis lupaster LC
    - Genus: Lycaon
      - African wild dog, Lycaon pictus EN
    - Genus: Vulpes
      - Rüppell's fox, Vulpes rueppelli LC
      - Red fox, Vulpes vulpes LC
      - Fennec, Vulpes zerda LC
  - Family: Mustelidae (mustelids)
    - Genus: Ictonyx
      - Saharan striped polecat, Ictonyx libyca LC
    - Genus: Mustela
      - Honey badger, Mellivora capensis LC presence uncertain
      - Least weasel, Mustela nivalis LC
  - Family: Phocidae (earless seals)
    - Genus: Monachus
      - Mediterranean monk seal, Monachus monachus EN

== Order: Artiodactyla (even-toed ungulates) ==
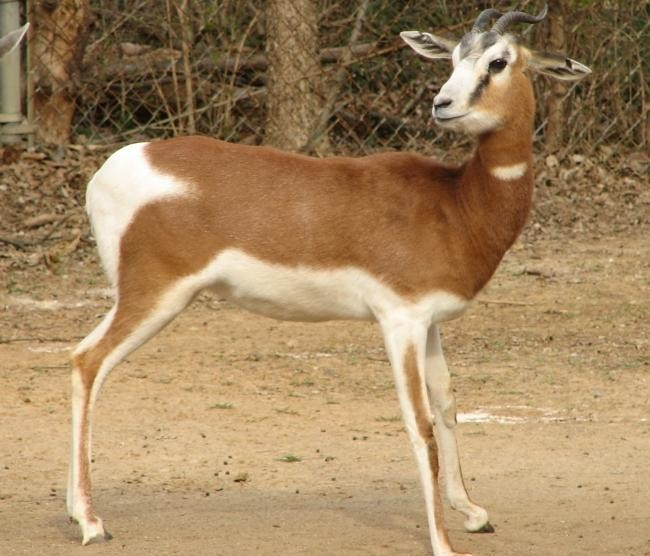
Dama gazelle

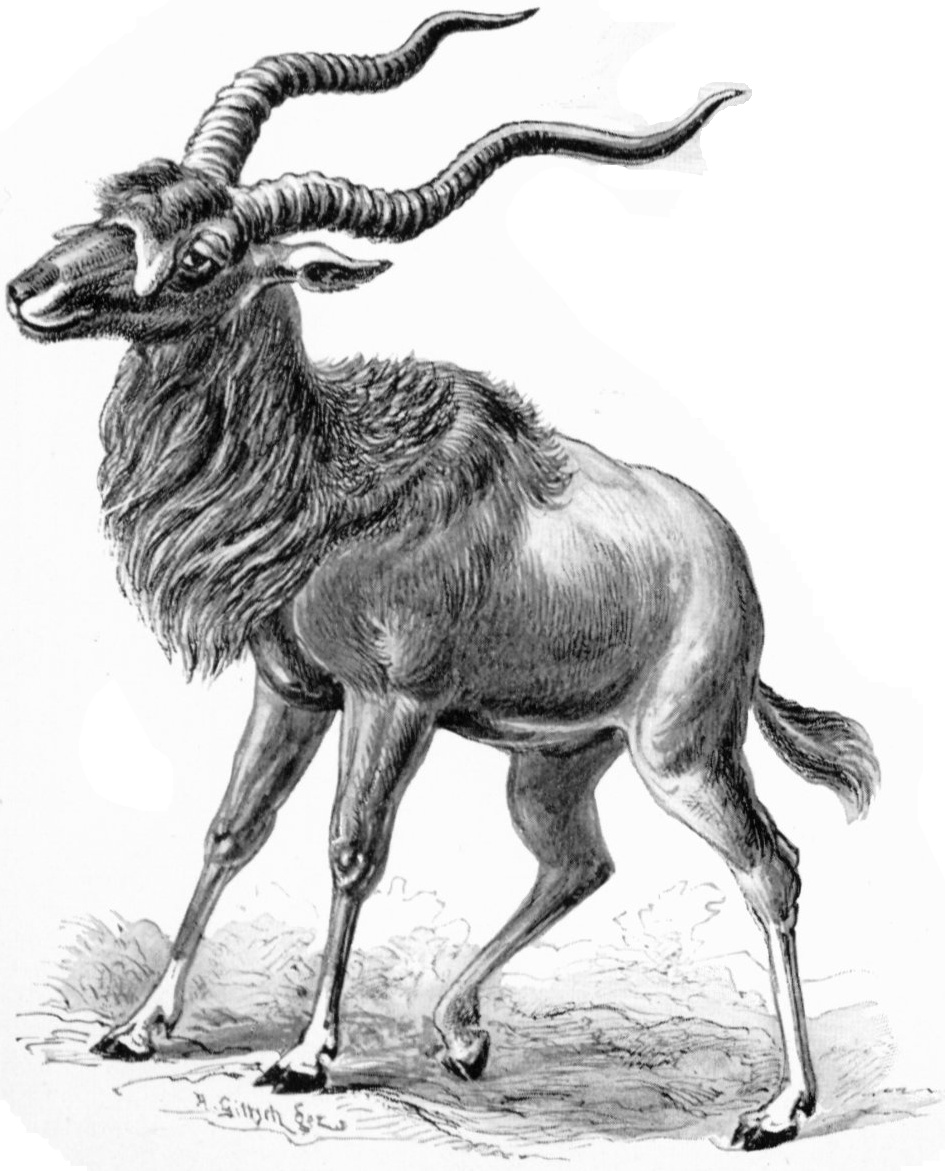
Addax

The even-toed ungulates are ungulates whose weight is borne about equally by the third and fourth toes, rather than mostly or entirely by the third as in perissodactyls. There are about 220 artiodactyl species, including many that are of great economic importance to humans.

- Family: Bovidae (cattle, antelope, sheep, goats)
  - Subfamily: Antilopinae
    - Genus: Gazella
      - Dorcas gazelle, G. dorcas VU
      - Rhim gazelle, G. leptoceros EN
    - Genus: Nanger
      - Dama gazelle, N. dama CR
  - Subfamily: Caprinae
    - Genus: Ammotragus
      - Barbary sheep, A. lervia VU

== Locally extinct ==
The following species are locally extinct in the country:

- Lion, Panthera leo
- Brown bear, Ursus arctos
- Addax, A. nasomaculatus
- Scimitar oryx, Oryx dammah
- Hartebeest, A. buselaphus
- Wild boar, Sus scrofa LC extirpated
- Northern giraffe, Giraffa camelopardalis VU extirpated

== See also ==
- List of chordate orders
- Lists of mammals by region
- List of prehistoric mammals
- Mammal classification
- List of mammals described in the 2000s
