= List of ecoregions in Libya =

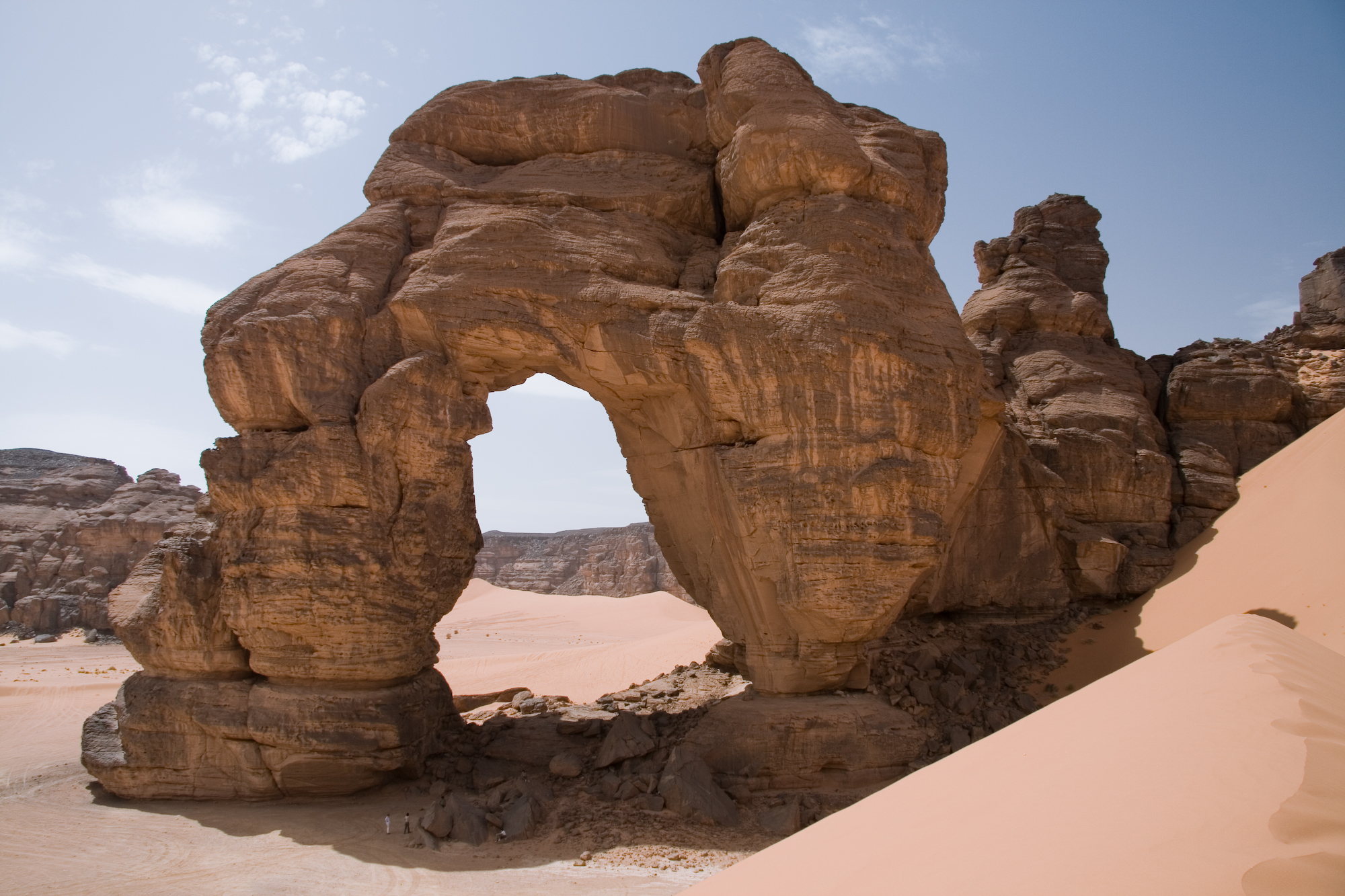
Tadrart Acacus is a desert area in western Libya. Part of the Sahara, it is one of the most arid ecoregions of Libya.

The following is a list of ecoregions in Libya, according to the Worldwide Fund for Nature (WWF).

== Terrestrial ecoregions ==
=== Palearctic ===
==== Mediterranean forests, woodlands, and scrub ====
- Mediterranean dry woodlands and steppe
- Mediterranean woodlands and forests

==== Deserts and xeric shrublands ====
- North Saharan steppe and woodlands
- Sahara Desert
- Tibesti-Jebel Uweinat montane xeric woodlands
- West Saharan montane xeric woodlands

==== Flooded grasslands and savannas ====
- Saharan halophytics

== Freshwater ecoregions ==
- Permanent Maghreb
- Temporary Maghreb
- Dry Sahel

== Marine ecoregions ==
- Levantine Sea
- Tunisian Plateau/Gulf of Sidra
