= National symbols of Libya =

Various national symbols of Libya include:

- National emblem of Libya
- Flag of Libya
- National anthem of Libya
