= Environmental issues in Libya =

Environmental issues in Libya include desertification and very limited natural freshwater resources.

== Environmental issues ==
=== Water supply ===
Annual rainfall averages only between 200 and 600 millimetres in the most arable portions of Libya. The Great Man-made River Project, designed to bring water from fossil aquifers beneath the Sahara, has no long-term viability because of the finite nature of the fossil reserves. A major environmental concern in Libya is the depletion of underground water as a result of overuse in agricultural developments, causing salinity and sea-water penetration into the coastal aquifers. The Great Man-Made River Project, currently under development to transport water from large aquifers under the Sahara Desert to coastal cities, is the world's most extensive water supply project.

=== Wastewater treatment ===
In Libya, municipal wastewater treatment is managed by the general company for water and wastewater in Libya, which falls within the competence of the Housing and Utilities Government Ministry. There are approximately 200 sewage treatment plants across the nation, but few plants are functioning. In fact, the 36 larger plants are in the major cities; however, only nine of them are operational, and the rest of them are under repair.

The largest operating wastewater treatment plants are situated in Sirte, Tripoli, and Misurata, with a design capacity of 21,000, 110,000, and 24,000 m3/day, respectively. Moreover, a majority of the remaining wastewater facilities are small and medium-sized plants with a design capacity of approximately 370 to 6700 m3/day. Therefore, 145,800 m3/day or 11 percent of the wastewater is actually treated, and the remaining others are released into the ocean and artificial lagoons although they are untreated. In fact, nonoperational wastewater treatment plants in Tripoli lead to a spill of over 1,275, 000 cubic meters of unprocessed water into the ocean every day.

=== Pollution and desertification ===
Another significant environmental problem in Libya is water pollution. The combined impact of sewage, oil byproducts, and industrial waste threatens Libya's coast and the Mediterranean Sea generally. Libya has 0.8 cu km of renewable water resources with 87% used in farming activity and 4% for industrial purposes. Only about 68% of the people living in rural areas have pure drinking water. Libya's cities produce about 0.6 million tons of solid waste per year. The desertification of existing fertile areas is being combated by the planting of trees as windbreaks.

=== Endangered species ===
As of 2001, 11 of Libya's mammal species and 2 of its bird species were endangered. About 41 of its plant species were also endangered. Endangered species in Libya include the Mediterranean monk seal, the leopard, and the slender-horned gazelle. The Bubal hartebeest and Sahara oryx are extinct.

== See also ==
- Climate change in the Middle East and North Africa
- Geography of Libya
- Protected areas of Libya
- Wildlife of Libya
