= Hinduism in Libya =

There are very few Hindus in Libya. They mainly traveled from India to work in Libya. There was an Indian community of about 10,000 individuals (in 2007), many of whom were likely to be Hindu. It is not known whether any Hindu temples exist in the country. At the time of the Libyan Revolution, there were 18,000 Hindus in Libya. But when the war broke out, many of them returned to India. As of 2020, there were 6,931 Hindus in Libya.

== Demographics ==
Historical Population
Year	Pop.	±%
2001	5,443	—
2007	10,000	+83.7%
2011	18,000	+80.0%
2015	6,418	−64.3%
2020	6,931	+8.0%

Year	Percent	Increase
2001	0.1%	-
2007	0.2%	+0.1%
2011	0.3%	+0.1%
2015	0.1%	-0.2
2020	0.1%	-
