= List of mammals of Tunisia =

This is a list of the mammal species recorded in Tunisia. Of the mammal species in Tunisia, three are critically endangered, three are endangered, nine are vulnerable, and two are near threatened. One of the species listed for Tunisia can no longer be found in the wild.

The following tags are used to highlight each species' conservation status as assessed by the International Union for Conservation of Nature:

EX	Extinct	No reasonable doubt that the last individual has died.
EW	Extinct in the wild	Known only to survive in captivity or as a naturalized populations well outside its previous range.
CR	Critically endangered	The species is in imminent risk of extinction in the wild.
EN	Endangered	The species is facing an extremely high risk of extinction in the wild.
VU	Vulnerable	The species is facing a high risk of extinction in the wild.
NT	Near threatened	The species does not meet any of the criteria that would categorise it as risking extinction but it is likely to do so in the future.
LC	Least concern	There are no current identifiable risks to the species.
DD	Data deficient	There is inadequate information to make an assessment of the risks to this species.

== Order: Macroscelidea (elephant shrews) ==
Often called sengis, the elephant shrews or jumping shrews are native to southern Africa. Their common English name derives from their elongated flexible snout and their resemblance to the true shrews.

- Family: Macroscelididae (elephant shrews)
  - Genus: Elephantulus
    - North African elephant shrew, E. rozeti LC

== Order: Rodentia (rats and mice) ==
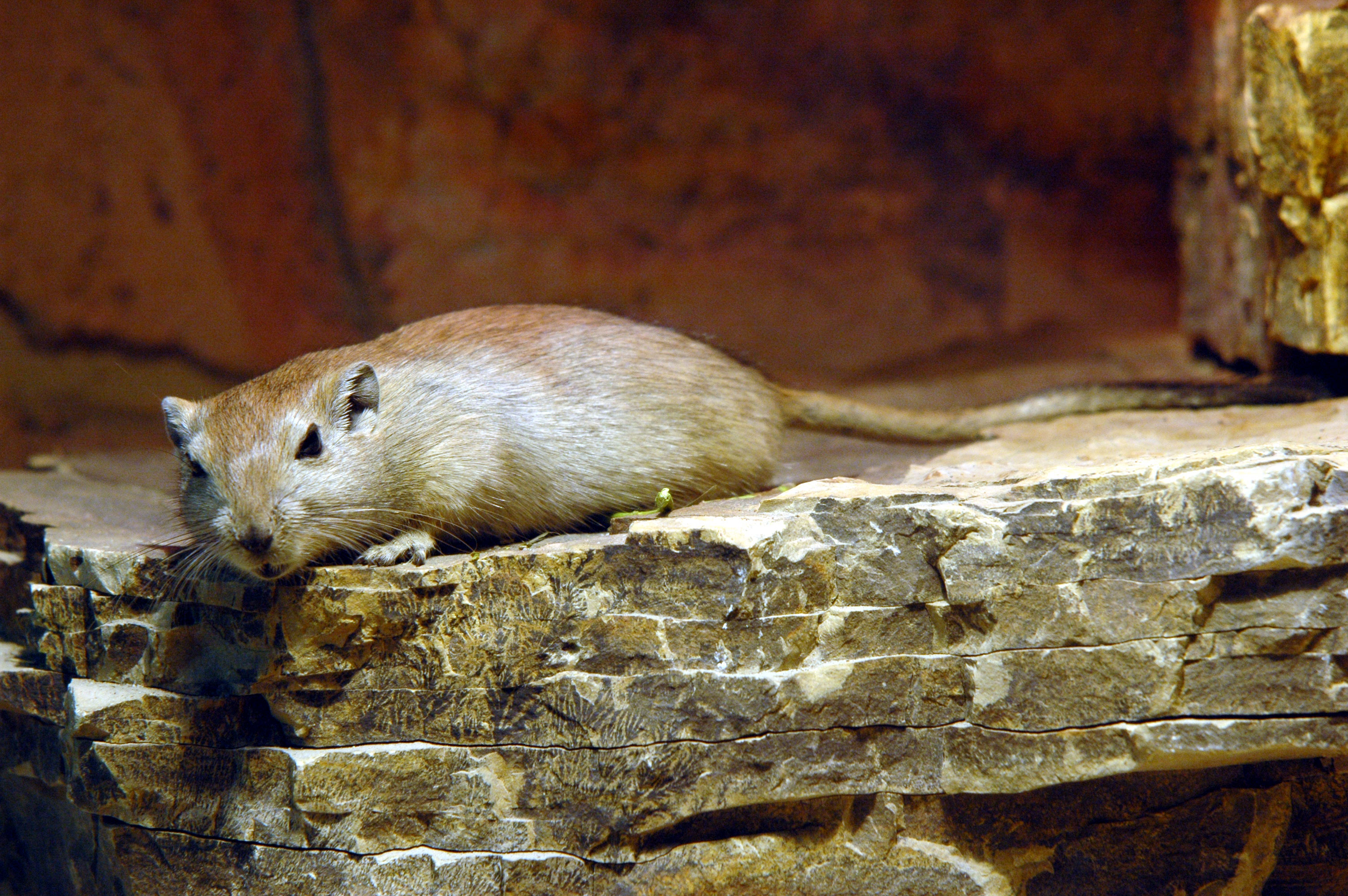
Sand rat

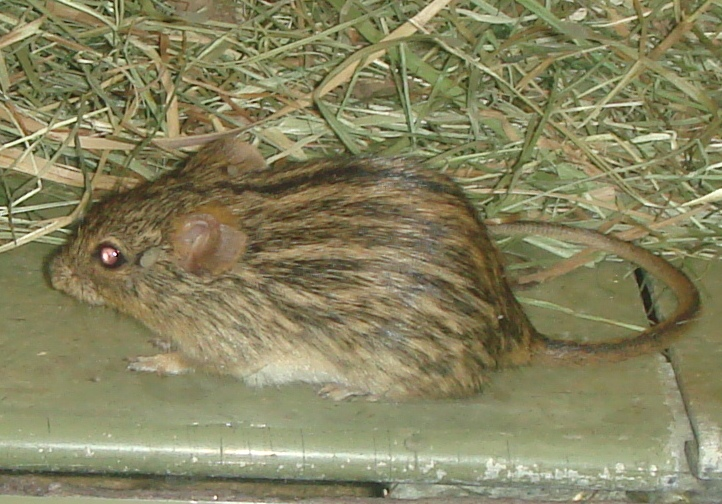
Barbary striped grass mouse

Rodents make up the largest order of mammals, with over 40% of mammalian species. They have two incisors in the upper and lower jaw which grow continually and must be kept short by gnawing. Most rodents are small though the capybara can weigh up to 45 kg (99 lb).

- Suborder: Hystricognathi
  - Family: Hystricidae (Old World porcupines)
    - Genus: Hystrix
      - Crested porcupine, H. cristata LC
- Suborder: Sciurognathi
  - Family: Gliridae (dormice)
    - Subfamily: Leithiinae
      - Genus: Eliomys
        - Asian garden dormouse, E. melanurus LC
  - Family: Dipodidae (jerboas)
    - Subfamily: Dipodinae
      - Genus: Jaculus
        - Lesser Egyptian jerboa, Jaculus jaculus LC
        - Greater Egyptian jerboa, Jaculus orientalis LC
  - Family: Muridae (mice, rats, voles, gerbils, hamsters, etc.)
    - Subfamily: Gerbillinae
      - Genus: Dipodillus
        - North African gerbil, Dipodillus campestris LC
      - Genus: Gerbillus
        - Anderson's gerbil, Gerbillus andersoni LC
        - Lesser Egyptian gerbil, Gerbillus gerbillus LC
        - Pygmy gerbil, Gerbillus henleyi LC
        - James's gerbil, Gerbillus jamesi DD
        - Lataste's gerbil, Gerbillus latastei LC
        - Balochistan gerbil, Gerbillus nanus LC
        - Lesser short-tailed gerbil, Gerbillus simoni LC
        - Tarabul's gerbil, Gerbillus tarabuli LC
      - Genus: Meriones
        - Libyan jird, Meriones libycus LC
        - Shaw's jird, Meriones shawi LC
      - Genus: Pachyuromys
        - Fat-tailed gerbil, Pachyuromys duprasi LC
      - Genus: Psammomys
        - Fat sand rat, Psammomys obesus LC
        - Thin sand rat, Psammomys vexillaris DD
    - Subfamily: Murinae
      - Genus: Apodemus
        - Wood mouse, Apodemus sylvaticus LC
      - Genus: Lemniscomys
        - Barbary striped grass mouse, Lemniscomys barbarus LC
      - Genus: Mus
        - Algerian mouse, Mus spretus LC
  - Family: Ctenodactylidae
    - Genus: Ctenodactylus
      - Common gundi, Ctenodactylus gundi LC

== Order: Lagomorpha ==
- Family: Leporidae (rabbits and hares)
  - Genus: Lepus
    - Cape hare, L. capensis LC

== Order: Erinaceomorpha (hedgehogs and gymnures) ==
The order Erinaceomorpha contains a single family, Erinaceidae, which comprise the hedgehogs and gymnures. The hedgehogs are easily recognised by their spines while gymnures look more like large rats.

- Family: Erinaceidae (hedgehogs)
  - Subfamily: Erinaceinae
    - Genus: Atelerix
      - North African hedgehog, Atelerix algirus LC
    - Genus: Hemiechinus
      - Desert hedgehog, Hemiechinus aethiopicus DD

== Order: Soricomorpha (shrews, moles, and solenodons) ==
The "shrew-forms" are insectivorous mammals. The shrews and solenodons closely resemble mice while the moles are stout-bodied burrowers.

- Family: Soricidae (shrews)
  - Subfamily: Crocidurinae
    - Genus: Crocidura
      - Whitaker's shrew, Crocidura whitakeri LC
    - Genus: Suncus
      - Etruscan shrew, Suncus etruscus LC

== Order: Chiroptera (bats) ==
The bats' most distinguishing feature is that their forelimbs are developed as wings, making them the only mammals capable of flight. Bat species account for about 20% of all mammals.

- Family: Vespertilionidae
  - Subfamily: Myotinae
    - Genus: Myotis
      - Long-fingered bat, M. capaccinii VU
      - Geoffroy's bat, M. emarginatus LC
      - Felten's myotis, Myotis punicus DD
  - Subfamily: Vespertilioninae
    - Genus: Eptesicus
      - Serotine bat, Eptesicus serotinus LC
    - Genus: Hypsugo
      - Savi's pipistrelle, H. savii LC
    - Genus: Otonycteris
      - Desert long-eared bat, Otonycteris hemprichii LC
    - Genus: Pipistrellus
      - Kuhl's pipistrelle, Pipistrellus kuhlii LC
      - Common pipistrelle, Pipistrellus pipistrellus LC
      - Rüppell's pipistrelle, Pipistrellus rueppelli LC
  - Subfamily: Miniopterinae
    - Genus: Miniopterus
      - Common bent-wing bat, M. schreibersii VU
- Family: Rhinopomatidae
  - Genus: Rhinopoma
    - Egyptian mouse-tailed bat, R. cystops LC
    - Lesser mouse-tailed bat, R. hardwickei LC
- Family: Rhinolophidae
  - Subfamily: Rhinolophinae
    - Genus: Rhinolophus
      - Blasius's horseshoe bat, R. blasii LC
      - Mediterranean horseshoe bat, R. euryale NT
      - Greater horseshoe bat, R. ferrumequinum LC
      - Lesser horseshoe bat, R. hipposideros LC
      - Mehely's horseshoe bat, R. mehelyi VU
  - Subfamily: Hipposiderinae
    - Genus: Asellia
      - Trident leaf-nosed bat, Asellia tridens LC

== Order: Cetacea (whales) ==
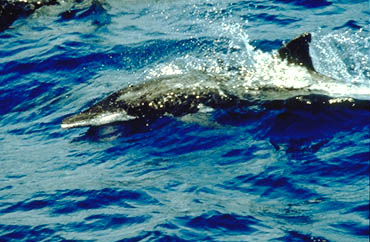
Rough-toothed dolphin

The order Cetacea includes whales, dolphins and porpoises. They are the mammals most fully adapted to aquatic life with a spindle-shaped nearly hairless body, protected by a thick layer of blubber, and forelimbs and tail modified to provide propulsion underwater.

- Suborder: Mysticeti
  - Family: Balaenopteridae
    - Genus: Balaenoptera
      - Common minke whale, Balaenoptera acutorostrata LC
      - Fin whale, Balaenoptera physalus VU
    - Subfamily: Megapterinae
      - Genus: Megaptera
        - Humpback whale, Megaptera novaeangliae LC
  - Family: Balaenidae
    - Genus: Eubalaena
      - North Atlantic right whale, Eubalaena glacialis CR (possible)
- Suborder: Odontoceti
  - Superfamily: Platanistoidea
    - Family: Delphinidae (marine dolphins)
      - Genus: Steno
        - Rough-toothed dolphin, Steno bredanensis LC
      - Genus: Delphinus
        - Short-beaked common dolphin, Delphinus delphis EN
      - Genus: Orcinus
        - Orca, Orcinus orca DD
      - Genus: Pseudorca
        - False killer whale, Pseudorca crassidens DD
      - Genus: Globicephala
        - Long-finned pilot whale, Globicephala melas DD
      - Genus: Grampus
        - Risso's dolphin, Grampus griseus DD
      - Genus: Stenella
        - Striped dolphin, Stenella coeruleoalba VU
      - Genus Tursiops
        - Common bottlenose dolphin, Tursiops truncatus VU
    - Family Physeteridae (sperm whales)
      - Genus: Physeter
        - Sperm whale, Physeter catodon EN
  - Superfamily Ziphioidea (beaked whales)
    - Family Ziphidae
      - Genus: Ziphius
        - Cuvier's beaked whale, Ziphius cavirostris LC

== Order: Carnivora (carnivorans) ==
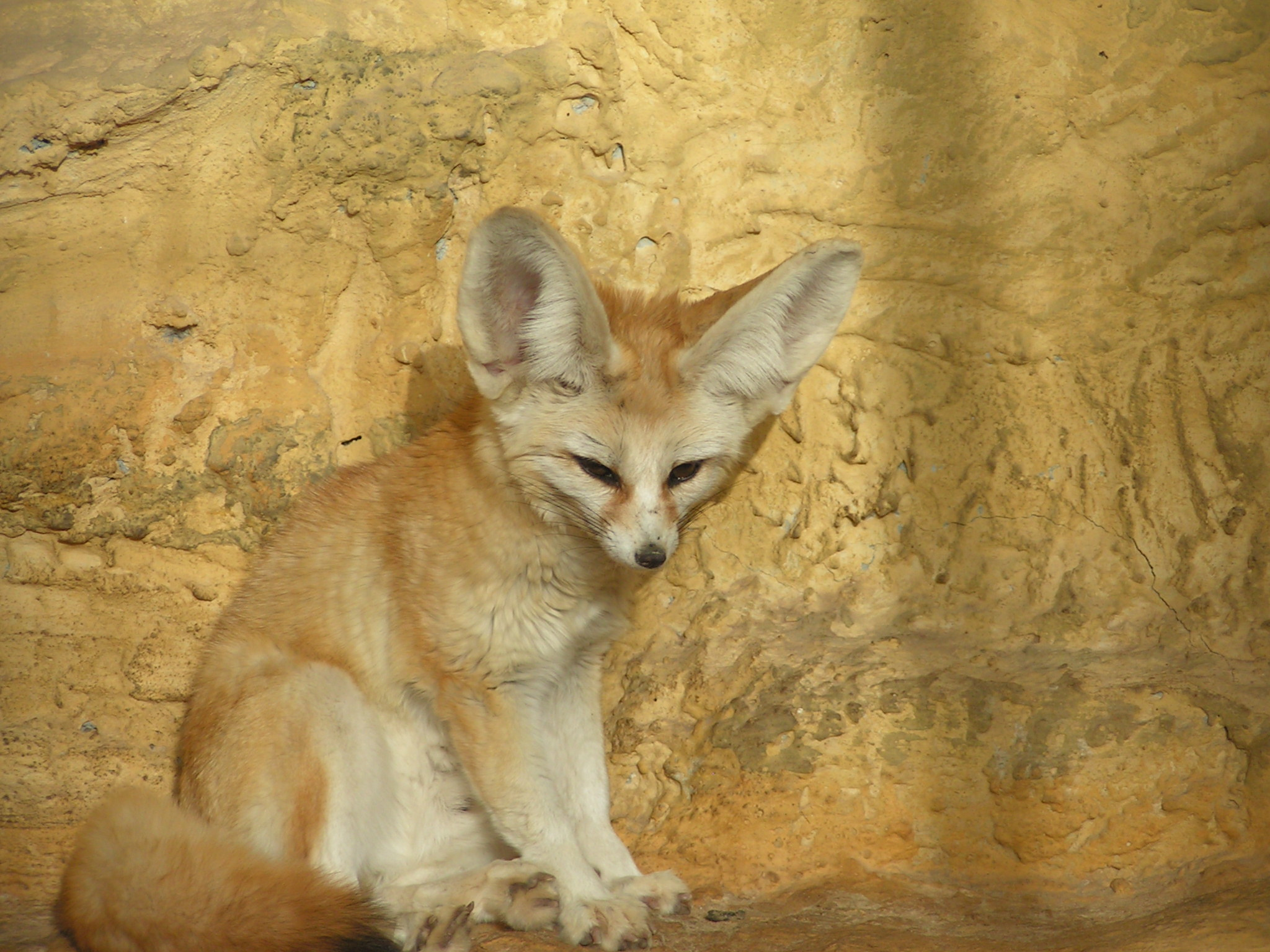
Fennec fox

There are over 260 species of carnivorans, the majority of which feed primarily on meat. They have a characteristic skull shape and dentition.

- Suborder: Feliformia
  - Family: Felidae (cats)
    - Subfamily: Felinae
      - Genus: Caracal
        - Caracal, C. caracal LC
      - Genus: Felis
        - African wildcat, F. lybica LC
      - Genus: Leptailurus
        - Serval, L. serval LC reintroduced
  - Family: Viverridae
    - Subfamily: Viverrinae
      - Genus: Genetta
        - Common genet, G. genetta LC
  - Family: Herpestidae (mongooses)
    - Genus: Herpestes
      - Egyptian mongoose, H. ichneumon LC
  - Family: Hyaenidae (hyaenas)
    - Genus: Hyaena
      - Striped hyena, H. hyaena NT
- Suborder: Caniformia
  - Family: Canidae (dogs, foxes)
    - Genus: Canis
      - African golden wolf, C. lupaster LC
    - Genus: Vulpes
      - Rüppell's fox, V. rueppellii LC
      - Red fox, V. vulpes LC
      - Fennec fox, V. zerda LC
  - Family: Mustelidae (mustelids)
    - Genus: Ictonyx
      - Saharan striped polecat, Ictonyx libyca LC
    - Genus: Lutra
      - Eurasian otter, L. lutra NT
  - Family: Phocidae (earless seals)
    - Genus: Monachus
      - Mediterranean monk seal, M. monachus EN possibly extirpated

== Order: Artiodactyla (even-toed ungulates) ==
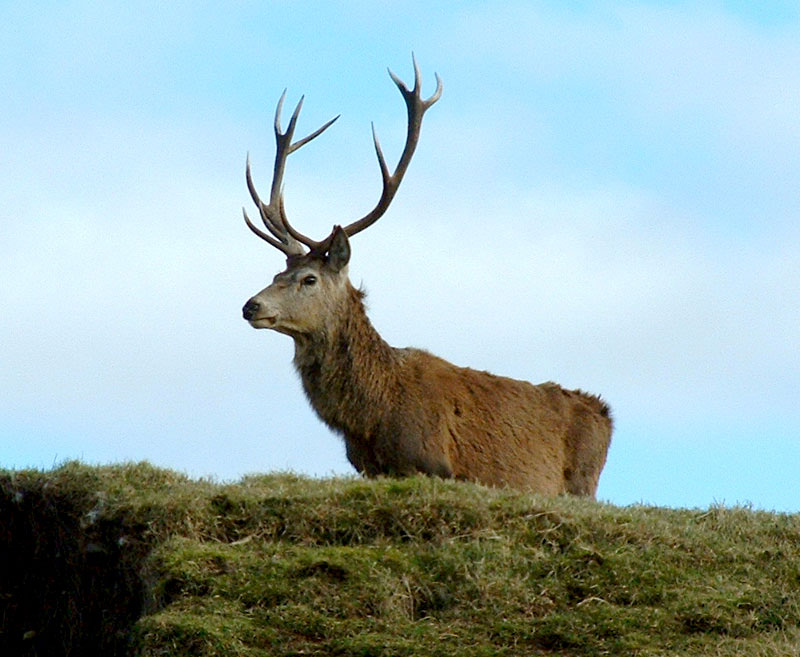
Red deer

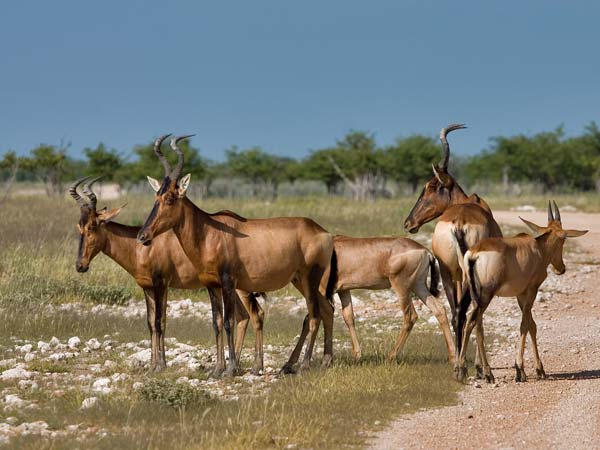
Hartebeest

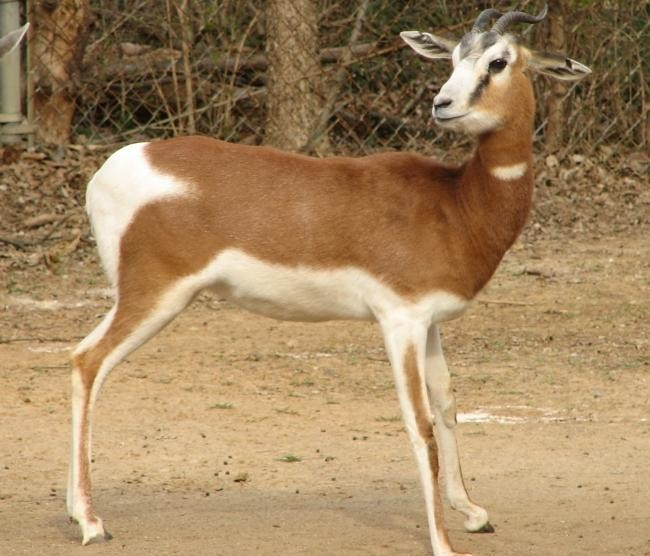
Dama gazelle

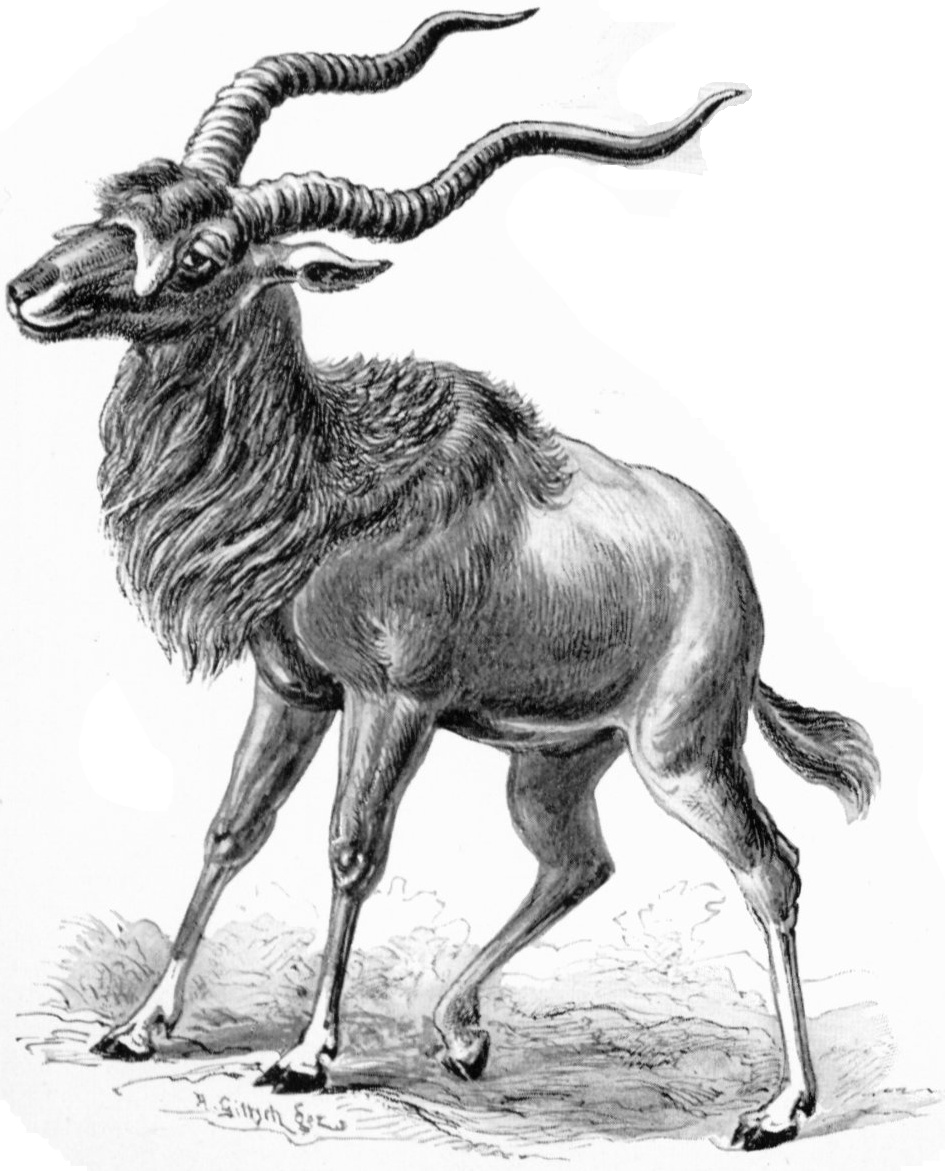
Addax

The even-toed ungulates are ungulates whose weight is borne about equally by the third and fourth toes, rather than mostly or entirely by the third as in perissodactyls. There are about 220 artiodactyl species, including many that are of great economic importance to humans.

- Family: Suidae (pigs)
  - Subfamily: Suinae
    - Genus: Sus
      - Wild boar, S. scrofa LC
- Family: Cervidae (deer)
  - Subfamily: Cervinae
    - Genus: Cervus
      - Red deer, C. elaphus LC
        - Barbary stag, C. e. barbarus
- Family: Bovidae (cattle, antelope, sheep, goats)
  - Subfamily: Antilopinae
    - Genus: Gazella
      - Cuvier's gazelle, G. cuvieri VU
      - Dorcas gazelle, G. dorcas EN
      - Rhim gazelle, G. leptoceros EN
  - Subfamily: Caprinae
    - Genus: Ammotragus
      - Barbary sheep, A. lervia VU
  - Subfamily: Hippotraginae
    - Genus: Oryx
      - Scimitar oryx, O. dammah EW vagrant

== Extinct ==
The following species are locally extinct in the country:

- Addax, Addax nasomaculatus. Though the last animal disappeared in 1932, it has been successfully reintroduced since 2007 from specimens from Niger and others kept in zoos. It was able to reproduce in the wild and even able to multiply outside of the fenced enclosure of the large national park where it had been reintroduced.
- Hartebeest, Alcelaphus buselaphus
- Aurochs, Bos primigenius
- Atlas wild ass, Equus africanus atlanticus EX (c. 300 AD)
- North African elephant, Loxodonta africana pharaohensis
- Barbary macaque, Macaca sylvanus
- Dama gazelle, Nanger dama
- Barbary lion, Panthera leo
- Leopard, Panthera pardus
- Brown bear, Ursus arctos

== See also ==
- Wildlife of Tunisia
- List of chordate orders
- Lists of mammals by region
- List of prehistoric mammals
- Mammal classification
- List of mammals described in the 2000s
