= List of mammals of Egypt =

This list provides information about the status of mammals alive today in Egypt. Three are critically endangered, three are endangered, eight are vulnerable, and one is near threatened. The following tags are used to highlight each species' conservation status as assessed on the respective IUCN Red Lists:

CR	Critically endangered	The species is in imminent risk of extinction in the wild.
EN	Endangered	The species is facing an extremely high risk of extinction in the wild.
VU	Vulnerable	The species is facing a high risk of extinction in the wild.
NT	Near threatened	The species does not meet any of the criteria that would categorise it as risking extinction but it is likely to do so in the future.
LC	Least concern	There are no current identifiable risks to the species.
DD	Data deficient	There is inadequate information to make an assessment of the risks to this species.
EX	Extinct	No reasonable doubt that the last individual has died.
EW	Extinct in the wild	Known only to survive in captivity or as a naturalized populations well outside its previous range.

== Order: Tubulidentata (aardvarks) ==
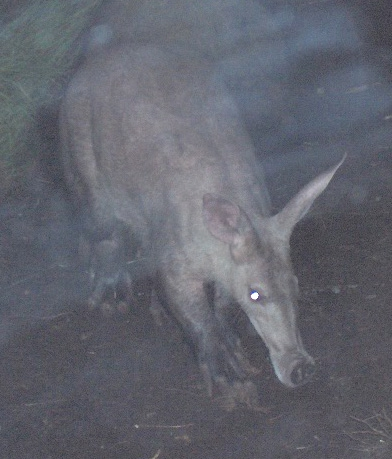
Aardvark

The order Tubulidentata consists of a single species, the aardvark. Tubulidentata are characterised by their teeth which lack a pulp cavity and form thin tubes which are continuously worn down and replaced.

- Family: Orycteropodidae
  - Genus: Orycteropus
    - Aardvark, O. afer LC

== Order: Hyracoidea (hyraxes) ==
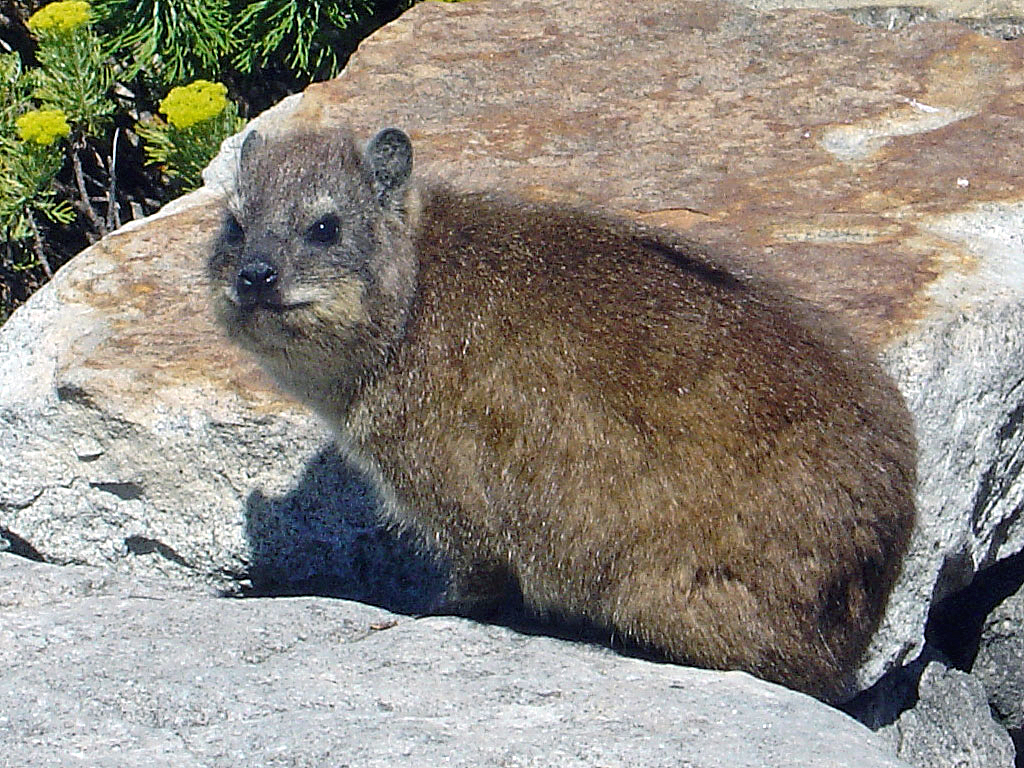
Cape hyrax

The hyraxes are any of four species of fairly small, thickset, herbivorous mammals in the order Hyracoidea. About the size of a domestic cat they are well furred, with rounded bodies and a stumpy tail. They are native to Africa and the Middle East.

- Family: Procaviidae (hyraxes)
  - Genus: Heterohyrax
    - Yellow-spotted rock hyrax, H. brucei LC
  - Genus: Procavia
    - Cape hyrax, P. capensis LC

== Order: Sirenia (manatees and dugongs) ==
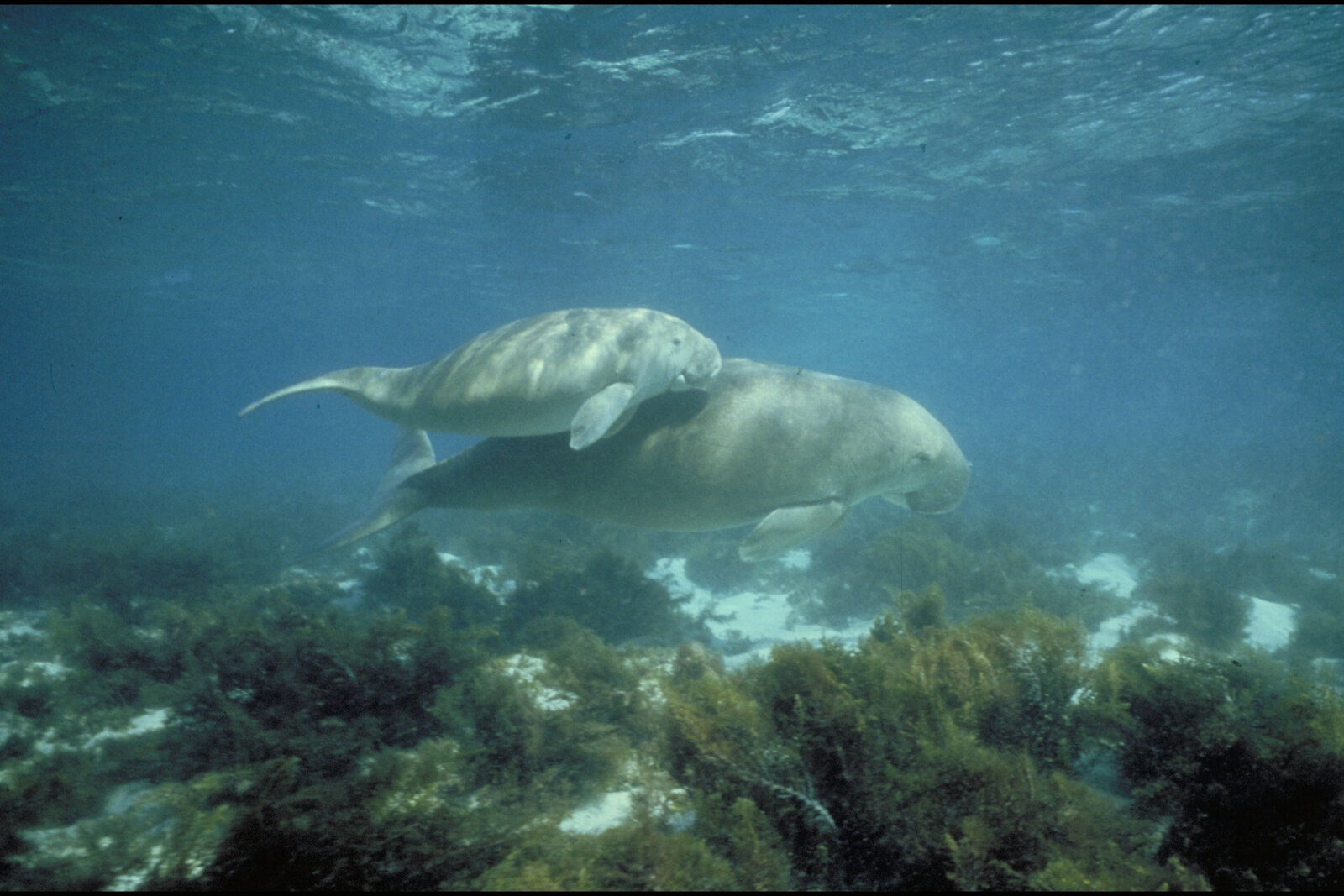
Dugongs

Sirenia is an order of fully aquatic, herbivorous mammals that inhabit rivers, estuaries, coastal marine waters, swamps, and marine wetlands. All four species are endangered. These animals live in warm coastal waters from East Africa to Australia, including the Red Sea, Indian Ocean, and Pacific.

- Family: Dugongidae
  - Genus: Dugong
    - Dugong, D. dugon VU

== Order: Rodentia (rodents) ==
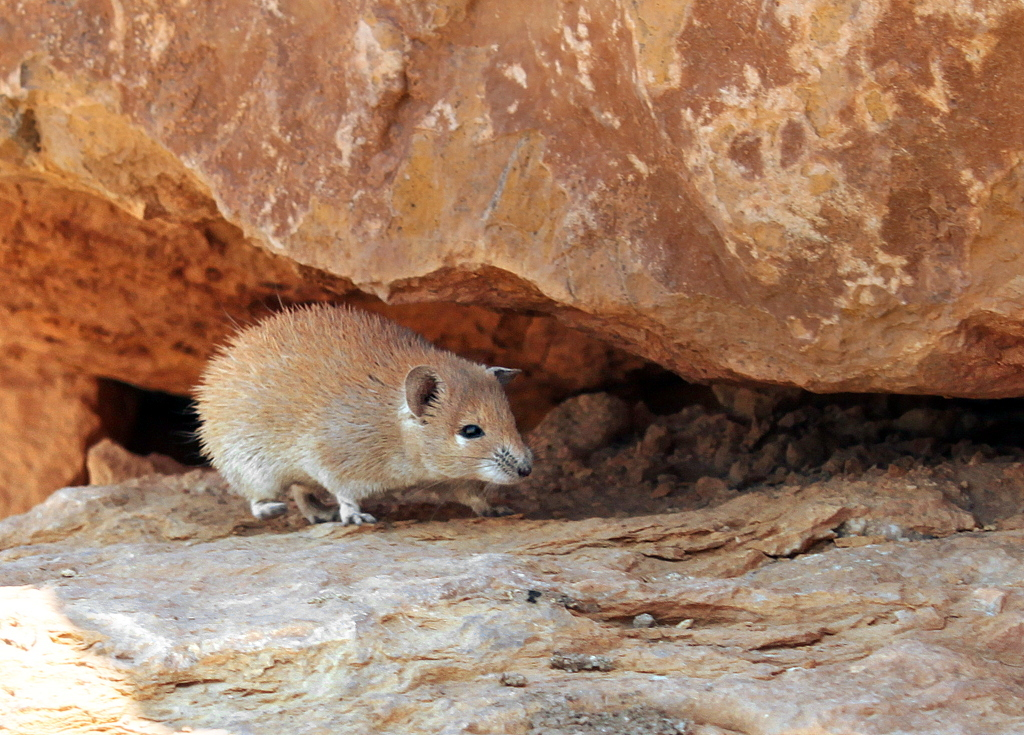
Golden spiny mouse

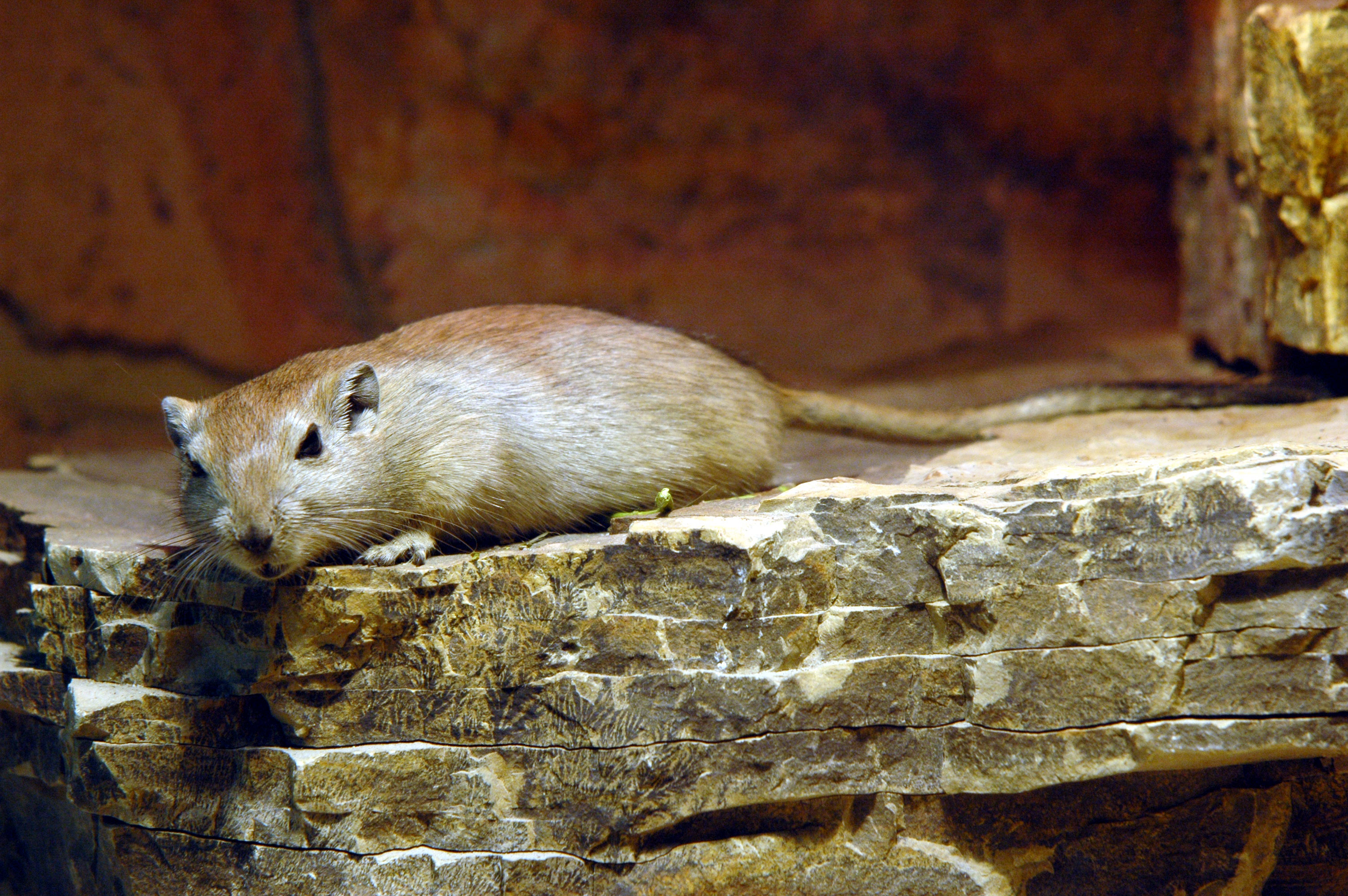
Sand rat

Rodents make up the largest order of mammals, with over 40% of mammalian species. They have two incisors in the upper and lower jaw which grow continually and must be kept short by gnawing. Most rodents are small though the capybara can weigh up to 45 kg (99 lb).

- Suborder: Hystricognathi
  - Family: Hystricidae (Old World porcupines)
    - Genus: Hystrix
      - Crested porcupine, H. cristata LC possibly extirpated
- Suborder: Sciurognathi
  - Family: Gliridae (dormice)
    - Subfamily: Leithiinae
      - Genus: Eliomys
        - Asian garden dormouse, E. melanurus LC
  - Family: Dipodidae (jerboas)
    - Subfamily: Allactaginae
      - Genus: Allactaga
        - Four-toed jerboa, Allactaga tetradactyla DD
    - Subfamily: Dipodinae
      - Genus: Jaculus
        - Lesser Egyptian jerboa, Jaculus jaculus LC
        - Greater Egyptian jerboa, Jaculus orientalis LC
  - Family: Spalacidae
    - Subfamily: Spalacinae
      - Genus: Nannospalax
        - Middle East blind mole-rat, Nannospalax ehrenbergi LC
  - Family: Muridae (mice, rats, voles, gerbils, hamsters, etc.)
    - Subfamily: Deomyinae
      - Genus: Acomys
        - Cairo spiny mouse, Acomys cahirinus LC
        - Golden spiny mouse, Acomys russatus LC
    - Subfamily: Gerbillinae
      - Genus: Dipodillus
        - North African gerbil, Dipodillus campestris LC
        - Mackilligin's gerbil, Dipodillus mackilligini LC
      - Genus: Gerbillus
        - Pleasant gerbil, Gerbillus amoenus DD
        - Anderson's gerbil, Gerbillus andersoni LC
        - Flower's gerbil, Gerbillus floweri LC
        - Lesser Egyptian gerbil, Gerbillus gerbillus LC
        - Pygmy gerbil, Gerbillus henleyi LC
        - Balochistan gerbil, Gerbillus nanus LC
        - Pale gerbil, Gerbillus perpallidus LC
        - Greater Egyptian gerbil, Gerbillus pyramidum LC
        - Lesser short-tailed gerbil, Gerbillus simoni LC
      - Genus: Meriones
        - Sundevall's jird, Meriones crassus LC
        - Libyan jird, Meriones libycus LC
        - Shaw's jird, Meriones shawi LC
      - Genus: Pachyuromys
        - Fat-tailed gerbil, Pachyuromys duprasi LC
      - Genus: Psammomys
        - Sand rat, Psammomys obesus LC
      - Genus: Sekeetamys
        - Bushy-tailed jird, Sekeetamys calurus LC
    - Subfamily: Murinae
      - Genus: Arvicanthis
        - African grass rat, Arvicanthis niloticus LC
      - Genus: Nesokia
        - Short-tailed bandicoot rat, Nesokia indica LC

== Order: Lagomorpha (lagomorphs) ==
The lagomorphs comprise two families, Leporidae (hares and rabbits), and Ochotonidae (pikas). Though they can resemble rodents, and were classified as a superfamily in that order until the early 20th century, they have since been considered a separate order. They differ from rodents in a number of physical characteristics, such as having four incisors in the upper jaw rather than two.

- Family: Leporidae (rabbits, hares)
  - Genus: Lepus
    - Cape hare, L. capensis LC

== Order: Erinaceomorpha (hedgehogs and gymnures) ==
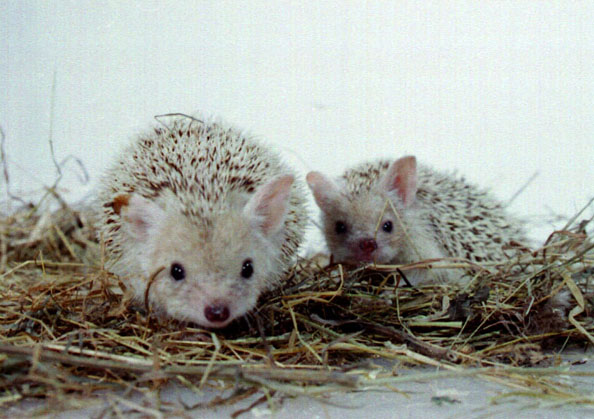
Long-eared hedgehog

The order Erinaceomorpha contains a single family, Erinaceidae, which comprise the hedgehogs and gymnures. The hedgehogs are easily recognised by their spines while gymnures look more like large rats.

- Family: Erinaceidae (hedgehogs)
  - Subfamily: Erinaceinae
    - Genus: Hemiechinus
      - Long-eared hedgehog, H. auritus LC
    - Genus: Paraechinus
      - Desert hedgehog, P. aethiopicus LC

== Order: Soricomorpha (shrews, moles, and solenodons) ==
The "shrew-forms" are insectivorous mammals. Shrews and solenodons closely resemble mice, while moles are stout-bodied burrowers.

- Family: Soricidae (shrews)
  - Subfamily: Crocidurinae
    - Genus: Crocidura
      - Flower's shrew, C. floweri DD
      - African giant shrew, C. olivieri LC
      - Egyptian pygmy shrew, C. religiosa DD
      - Lesser white-toothed shrew, C. suaveolens LC
    - Genus: Suncus
      - Asian house shrew, S. murinus LC

== Order: Chiroptera (bats) ==
The bats' most distinguishing feature is that their forelimbs are developed as wings, making them the only mammals capable of flight. Bat species account for about 20% of all mammals.

- Family: Pteropodidae (flying foxes, Old World fruit bats)
  - Subfamily: Pteropodinae
    - Genus: Rousettus
      - Egyptian fruit bat, R. aegyptiacus LC
- Family: Vespertilionidae
  - Subfamily: Vespertilioninae
    - Genus: Eptesicus
      - Botta's serotine, Eptesicus bottae LC
    - Genus: Hypsugo
      - Desert pipistrelle, Hypsugo ariel DD
    - Genus: Nycticeinops
      - Schlieffen's bat, Nycticeinops schlieffeni LC
    - Genus: Otonycteris
      - Desert long-eared bat, Otonycteris hemprichii LC
    - Genus: Pipistrellus
      - Egyptian pipistrelle, Pipistrellus deserti LC
      - Kuhl's pipistrelle, Pipistrellus kuhlii LC
      - Rüppell's pipistrelle, Pipistrellus rueppelli LC
    - Genus: Plecotus
      - Christie's big-eared bat, Plecotus christiei DD
- Family: Rhinopomatidae
  - Genus: Rhinopoma
    - Egyptian mouse-tailed bat, R. cystops LC
    - Lesser mouse-tailed bat, Rhinopoma hardwickei LC
    - Greater mouse-tailed bat, Rhinopoma microphyllum LC
- Family: Molossidae
  - Genus: Tadarida
    - Egyptian free-tailed bat, Tadarida aegyptiaca LC
    - European free-tailed bat, Tadarida teniotisLC
- Family: Emballonuridae
  - Genus: Taphozous
    - Naked-rumped tomb bat, Taphozous nudiventris LC
    - Egyptian tomb bat, Taphozous perforatus LC
- Family: Nycteridae
  - Genus: Nycteris
    - Egyptian slit-faced bat, Nycteris thebaica LC
- Family: Rhinolophidae
  - Subfamily: Rhinolophinae
    - Genus: Rhinolophus
      - Geoffroy's horseshoe bat, Rhinolophus clivosus LC
      - Lesser horseshoe bat, R. hipposideros LC
  - Subfamily: Hipposiderinae
    - Genus: Asellia
      - Trident leaf-nosed bat, Asellia tridens LC

== Order: Cetacea (whales and dolphins and porpoises) ==
The order Cetacea includes whales, dolphins and porpoises. They are the mammals most fully adapted to aquatic life with a spindle-shaped nearly hairless body, protected by a thick layer of blubber, and forelimbs and tail modified to provide propulsion underwater.

Species listed below also includes species being recorded in Levantine Sea.

- Suborder: Mysticeti
  - Family: Balaenopteridae
    - Genus: Balaenoptera
      - Fin whale, Balaenoptera physalus VU
      - Bryde's whale, Balaenoptera edeni DD
      - Common minke whale, Balaenoptera acutorostrata LC
- Subfamily: Megapterinae
  - Genus: Megaptera
    - Humpback whale, Megaptera novaeangliae LC and CR (Arabian Sea population)
- Suborder: Odontoceti
  - Family: Physeteridae
    - Genus: Physeter
      - Sperm whale, Physeter macrocephalus VU
  - Family: Ziphidae
    - Genus: Ziphius
      - Cuvier's beaked whale, Ziphius cavirostris LC
    - Genus: Mesoplodon
      - Gervais' beaked whale, Mesoplodon europaeus DD
  - Superfamily: Platanistoidea
    - Family: Delphinidae (marine dolphins)
      - Genus: Tursiops
        - Common bottlenose dolphin, Tursiops truncatus LC
        - Indo-Pacific bottlenose dolphin, Tursiops aduncus DD
      - Genus: Steno
        - Rough-toothed dolphin, Steno bredanensis DD (once being considered as vagrants, but later confirmed as residential)
      - Genus: Stenella
        - Striped dolphin, Stenella coeruleoalba DD
        - Pantropical spotted dolphin, Stenella attenuata LC
        - Spinner dolphin, Stenella longirostris LC
      - Genus: Sousa
        - Indo-Pacific humpback dolphin, Sousa chinensis DD
      - Genus: Delphinus
        - Short-beaked common dolphin, Delphinus delphis LC
        - Indo-Pacific common dolphin, Delphinus tropicalis DD
      - Genus: Grampus
        - Risso's dolphin, Grampus griseus LC
      - Genus: Orcinus
        - Orca, O. orca DD
      - Genus: Pseudorca
        - False killer whale, Pseudorca crassidens DD
      - Genus: Globicephala
        - Long-finned pilot whale, Globicephala melas DD
        - Short-finned pilot whale, Globicephala macrorhynchus DD

== Order: Carnivora (carnivorans) ==
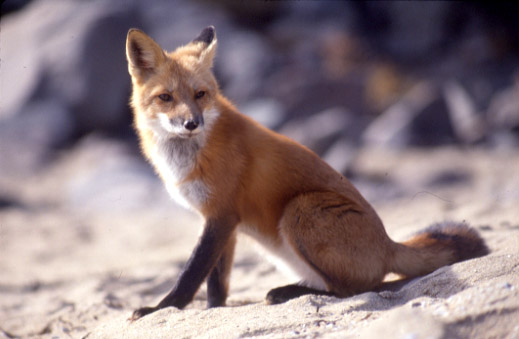
Red fox

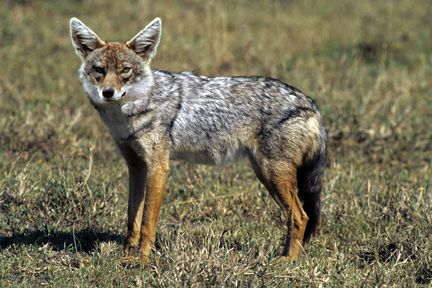
African golden wolf

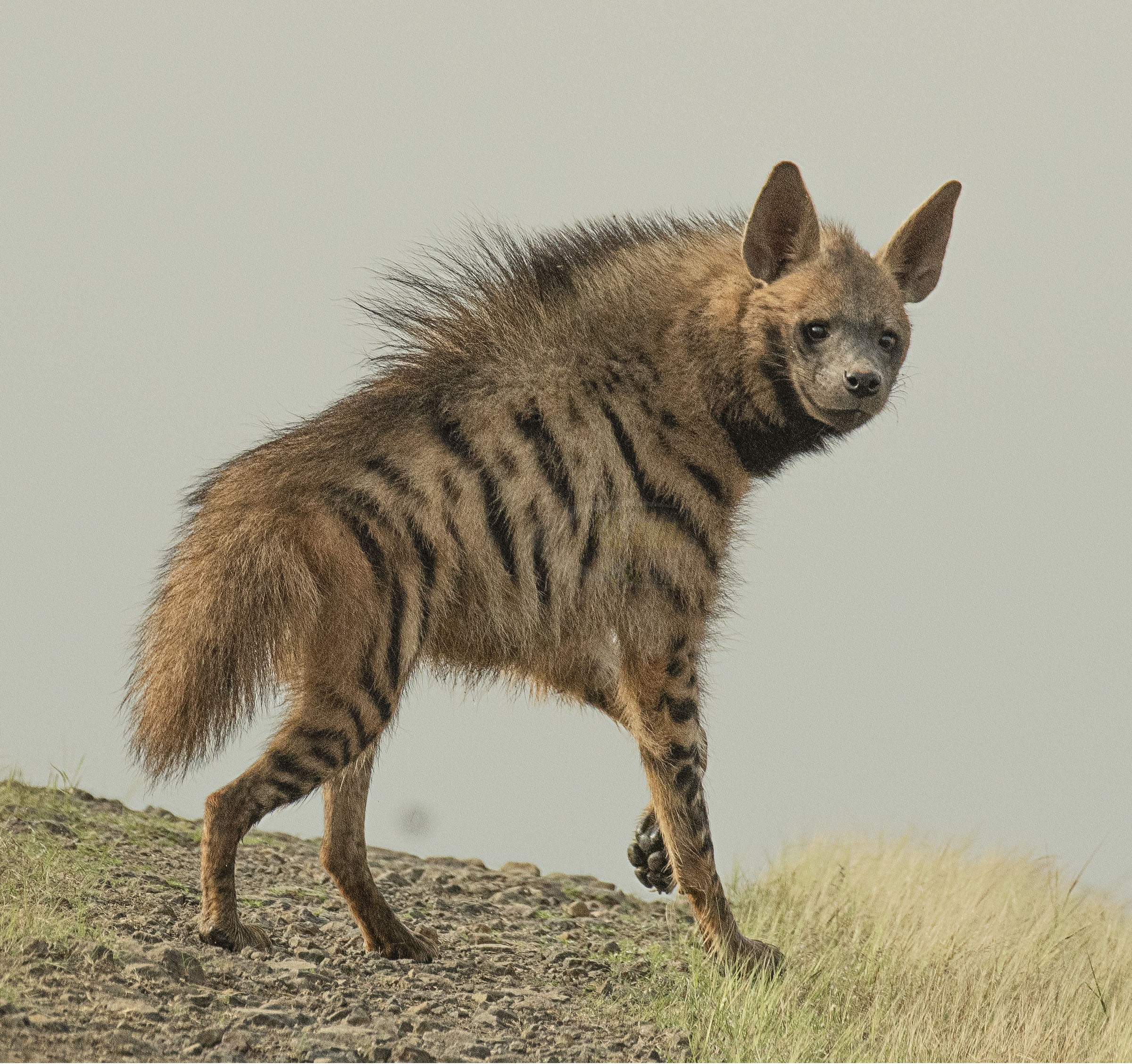
Striped hyena

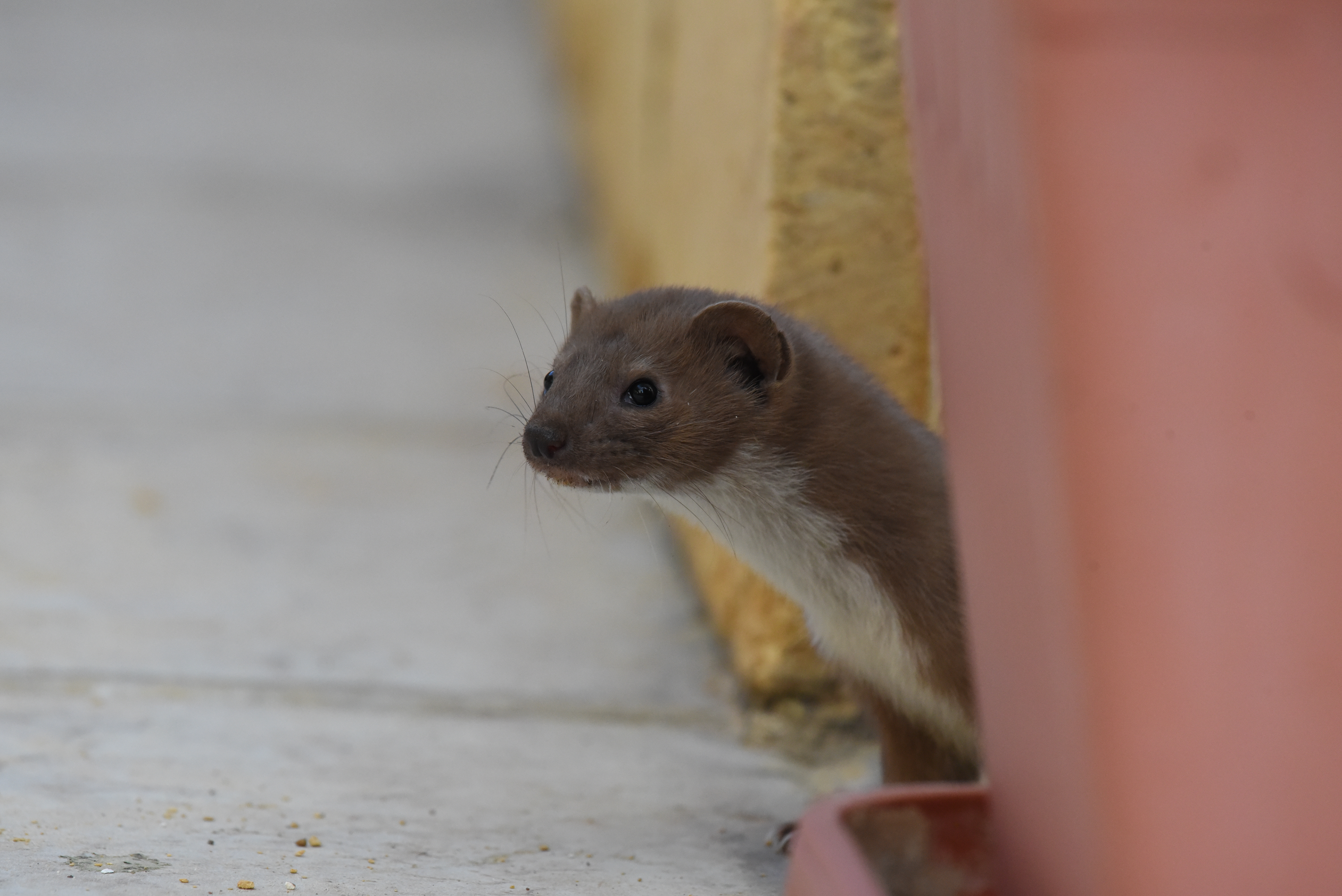
Egyptian weasel

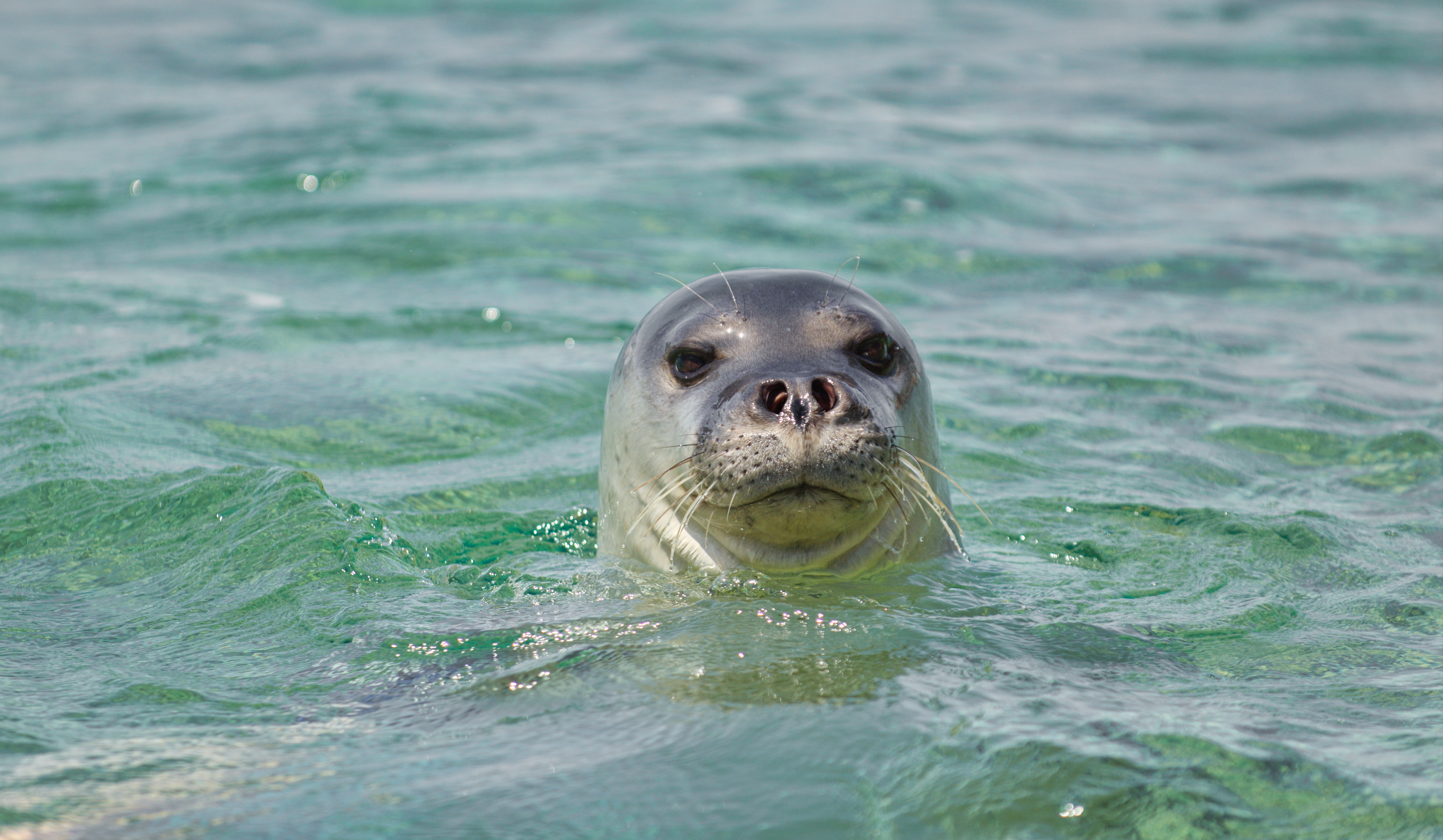
Mediterranean monk seal

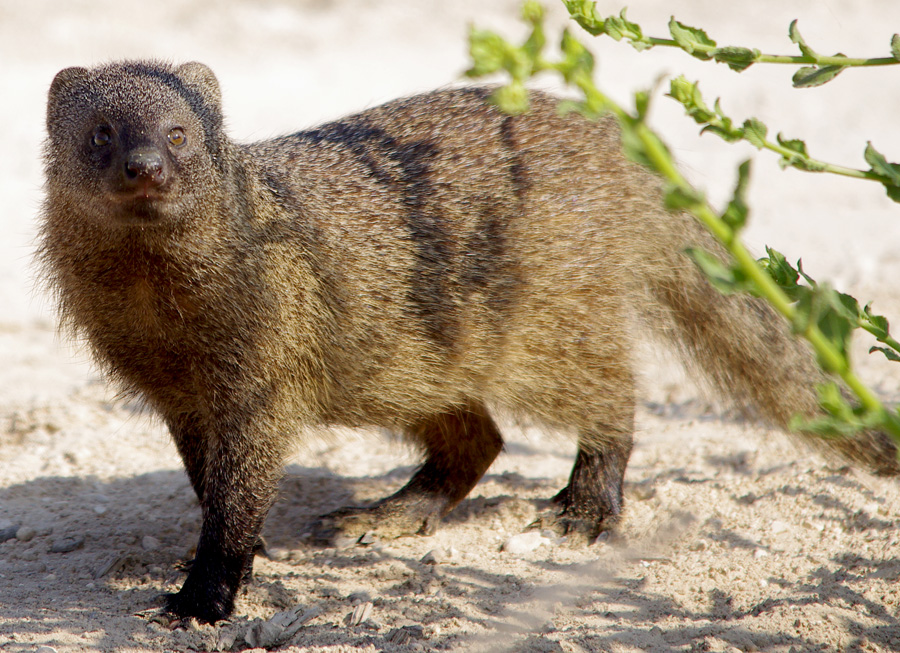
Egyptian mongoose

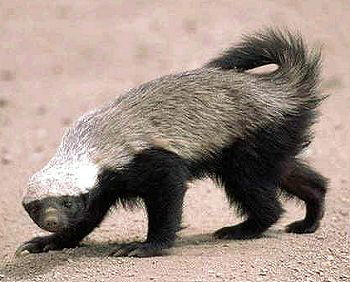
Honey badger

There are over 260 species of carnivorans, the majority of which eat meat as their primary dietary item. They have a characteristic skull shape and dentition.

- Suborder: Feliformia
  - Family: Felidae (cats)
    - Subfamily: Felinae
      - Genus: Acinonyx
        - Cheetah, A. jubatus VU presence uncertain
      - Genus: Caracal
        - Caracal, C. caracal LC
      - Genus: Felis
        - Jungle cat, F. chaus LC
        - African wildcat, F. lybica LC
        - Sand cat, F. margarita NT
    - Subfamily: Pantherinae
      - Genus: Panthera
        - Leopard, P. pardus VU
          - African leopard, P. p. pardus
  - Family: Viverridae (civets, mongooses, etc.)
    - Subfamily: Viverrinae
      - Genus: Genetta
        - Common genet, G. genetta LC
  - Family: Herpestidae (mongooses)
    - Genus: Herpestes
      - Egyptian mongoose, H. ichneumon LC
    - Genus: Ichneumia
      - White-tailed mongoose, I. albicauda LC
  - Family: Hyaenidae (hyaenas)
    - Genus: Hyaena
      - Striped hyena, H. hyaena LC
    - Genus: Crocuta
      - Spotted hyena, C. crocuta LC rediscovered
    - Genus: Proteles
      - Aardwolf, P. cristata LC
- Suborder: Caniformia
  - Family: Canidae (dogs, foxes)
    - Genus: Canis
      - Golden jackal, C. aureus LC vagrant
      - African golden wolf, C. lupaster LC
      - Gray wolf, C. lupus LC
        - Arabian wolf, C. l. arabs
    - Genus: Vulpes
      - Blanford's fox, V. cana LC
      - Rüppell's fox, V. rueppelli LC
      - Red fox, V. vulpes LC
      - Fennec fox, V. zerda LC
  - Family: Mustelidae (mustelids)
    - Genus: Ictonyx
      - Saharan striped polecat, I. libyca LC
    - Genus: Meles
      - Caucasian badger, M. canescens NE
    - Genus: Mellivora
      - Honey badger, M. capensis LC presence uncertain, vagrant
    - Genus: Mustela
      - Least weasel, M. nivalis LC
        - Egyptian weasel, M. n. subpalmata LC
  - Family: Phocidae (earless seals)
    - Genus: Monachus
      - Mediterranean monk seal, M. monachus VU possibly extirpated

== Order: Perissodactyla (odd-toed ungulates) ==
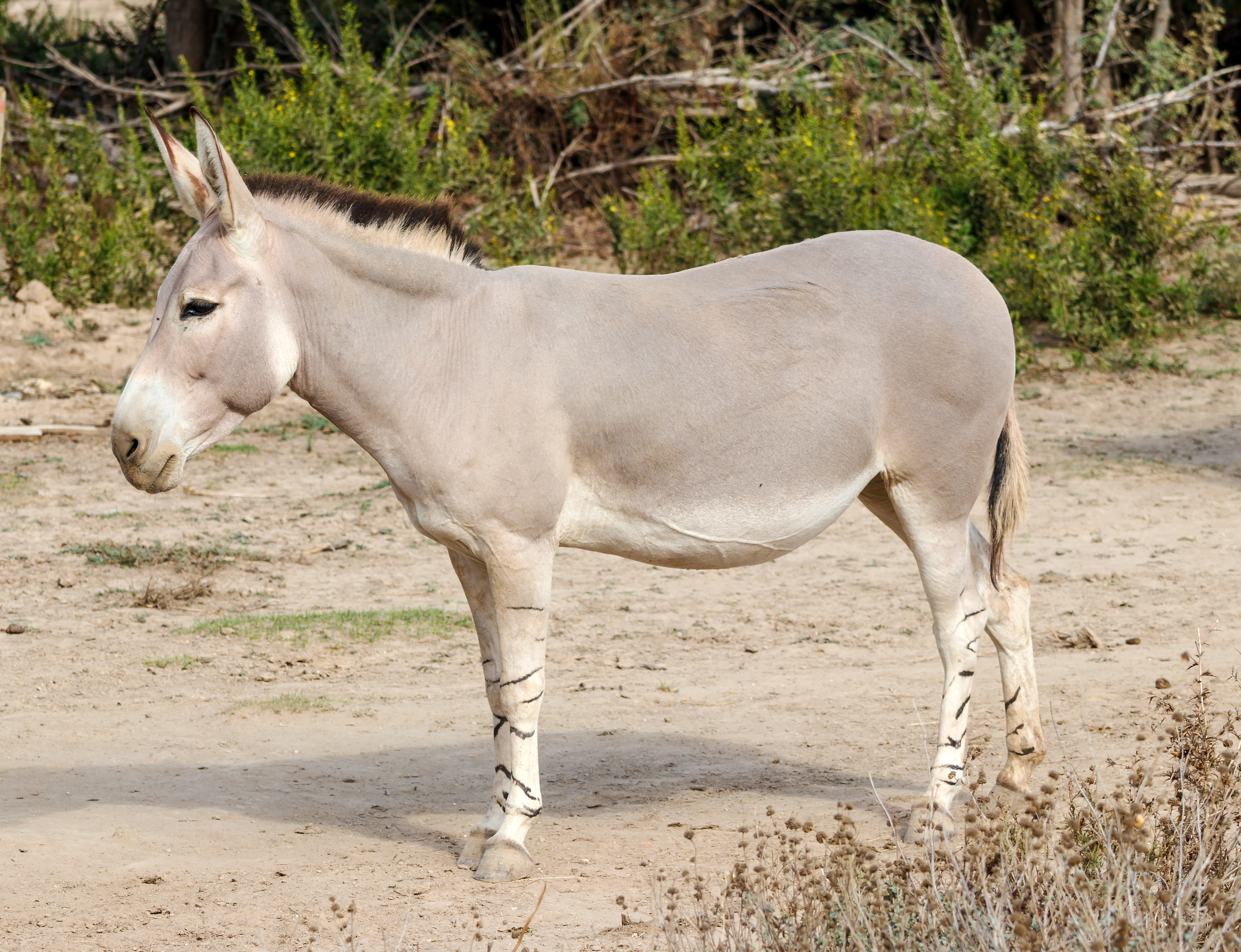
Somali wild ass

The odd-toed ungulates are browsing and grazing mammals. They are usually large to very large, and have relatively simple stomachs and a large middle toe.

- Family: Equidae (horses etc.)
  - Genus: Equus
    - African wild ass, E. africanus CR presence uncertain

== Order: Artiodactyla (even-toed ungulates) ==
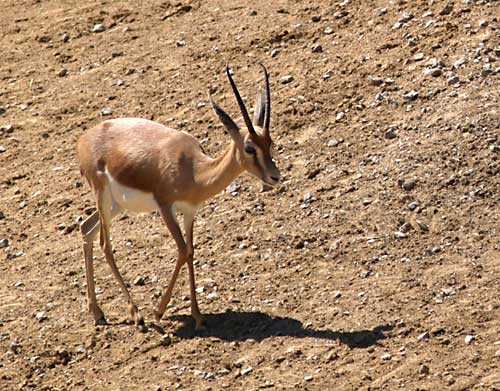
Dorcas gazelle

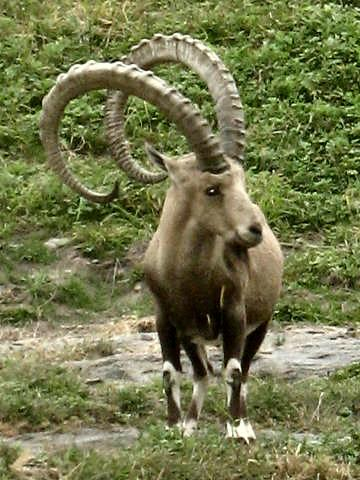
Nubian ibex

The even-toed ungulates are ungulates whose weight is borne about equally by the third and fourth toes, rather than mostly or entirely by the third as in perissodactyls. There are about 220 artiodactyl species, including many that are of great economic importance to humans.

- Family: Bovidae (cattle, antelope, sheep, goats)
  - Genus: Gazella
    - Arabian gazelle, G. arabica VU presence uncertain
    - Dorcas gazelle, G. dorcas VU
    - Mountain gazelle, G. gazella EN presence uncertain
    - Rhim gazelle, G. leptoceros EN
  - Subfamily: Caprinae
    - Genus: Ammotragus
      - Barbary sheep, A. lervia VU
    - Genus: Capra
      - Nubian ibex, C. nubiana VU
- Family: Camelidae
  - Subfamily: Camelini
    - Genus: Camelus
      - Dromedary camel, C. dromedarius LC

== Globally and locally extinct ==
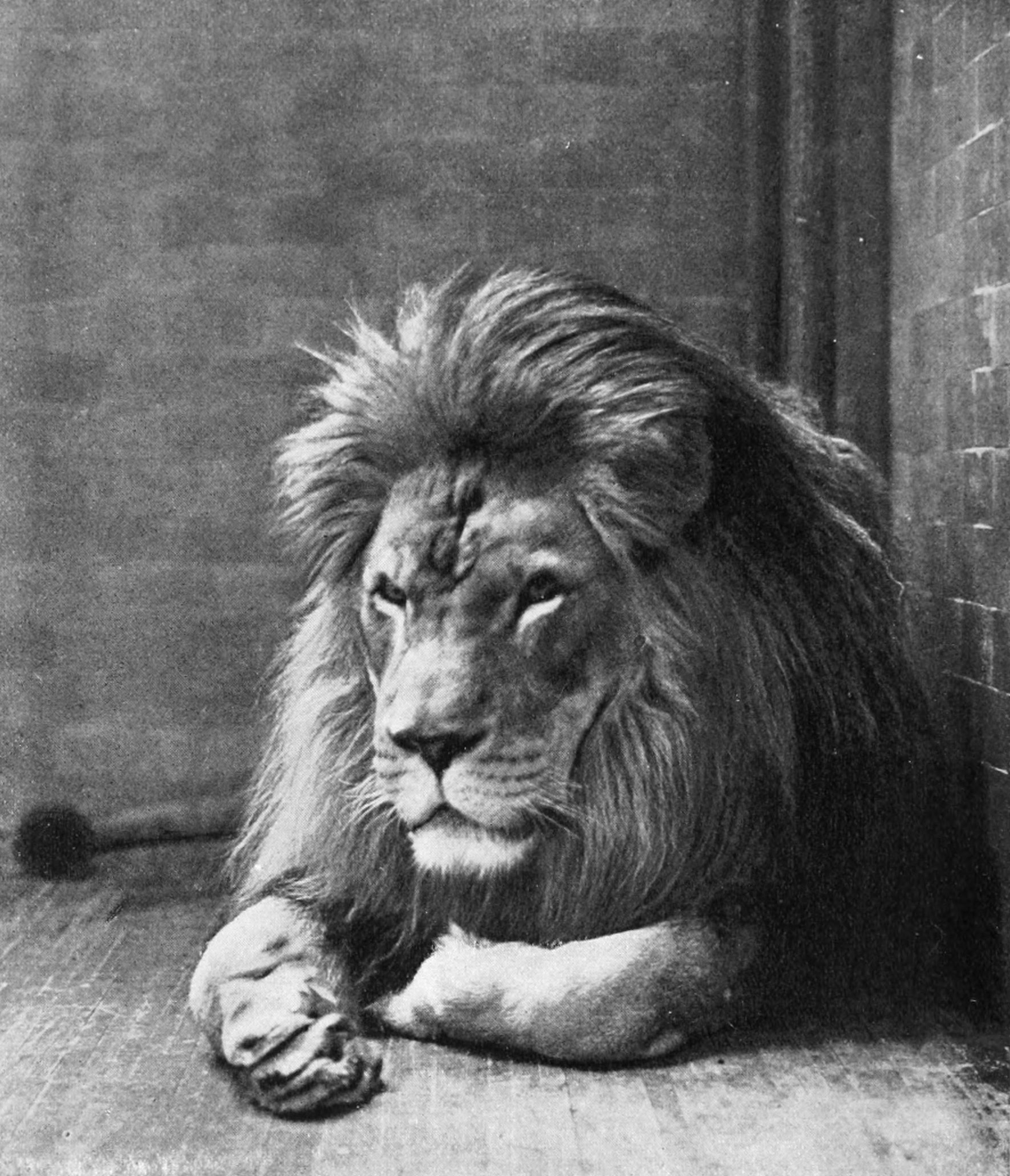
Barbary lion in captivity

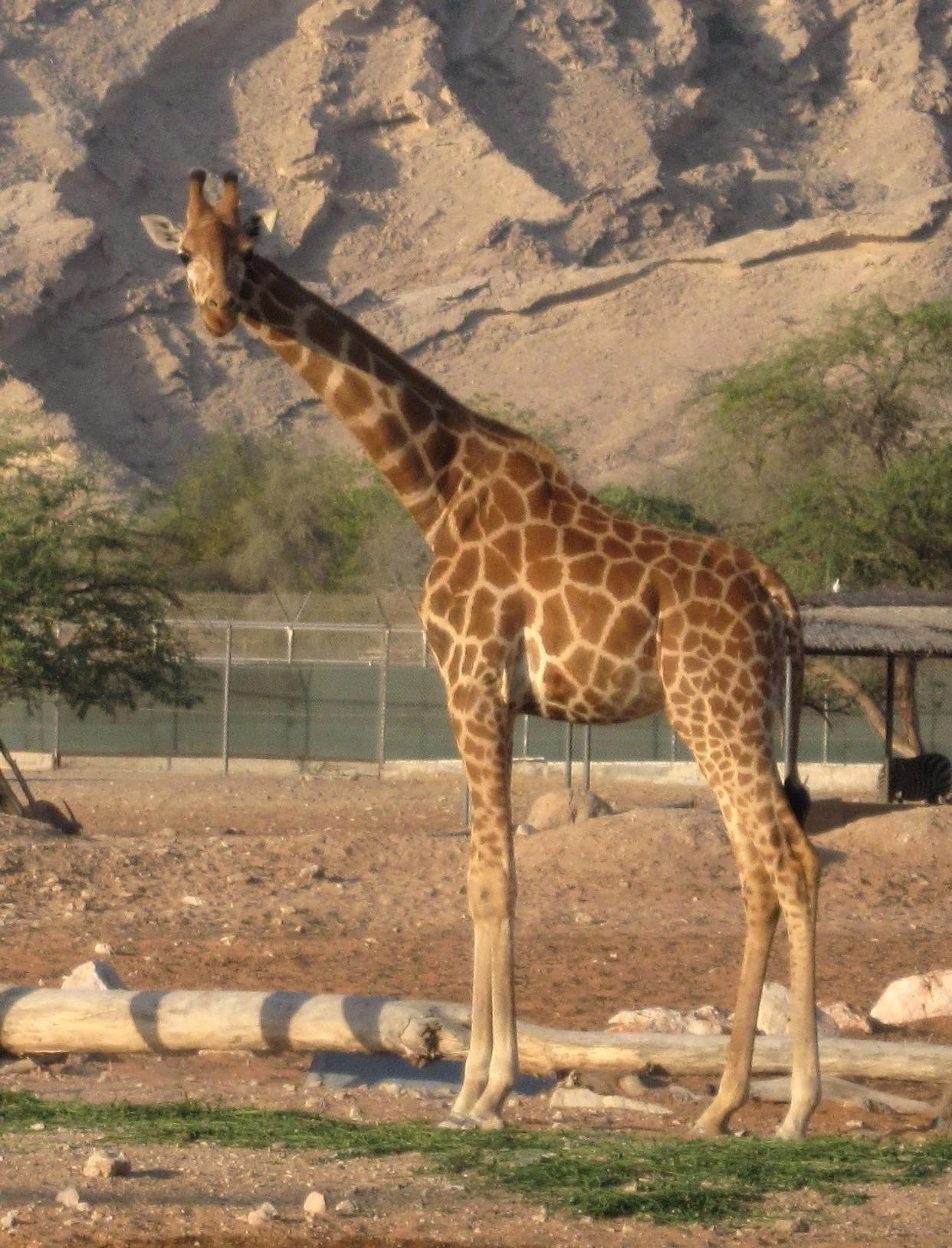
Nubian giraffe

The following subspecies are globally extinct

- Atlas bear, Ursus arctos crowtheri EX (1870)
- Atlas wild ass, Equus africanus atlanticus EX (c. 300 AD)
- Balsam shrew, Crocidura balsamifera EX (c. 821 - 171 BC)
- Bubal hartebeest, Alcelaphus buselaphus buselaphus EX (1925)
- North African elephant, Loxodonta africana pharaohensis EX (c. 400 AD)

The following species are locally extinct in Egypt, but continue to exist elsewhere or in captivity:

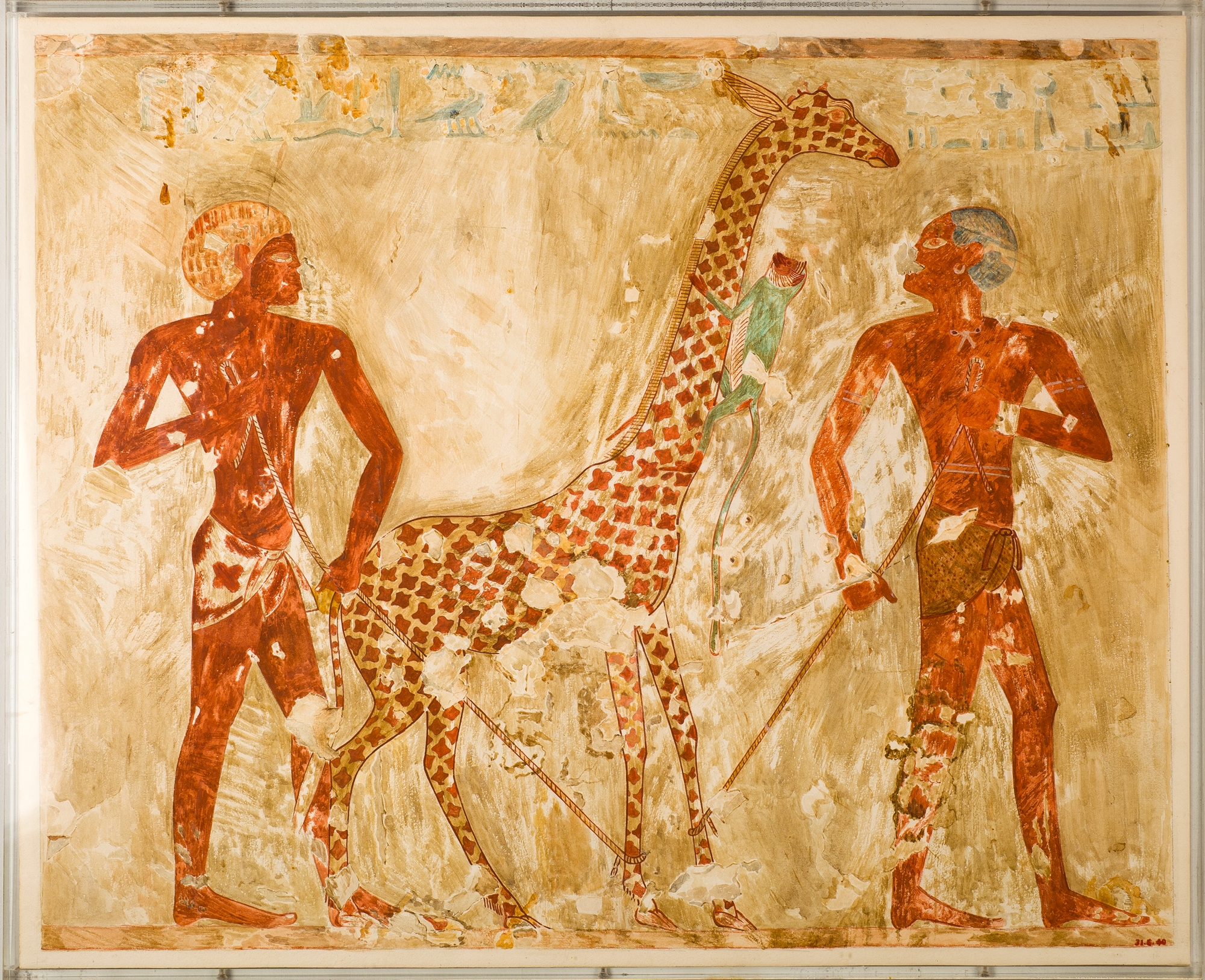
Northern giraffe depicted in the tomb of Rekhmire in Thebes

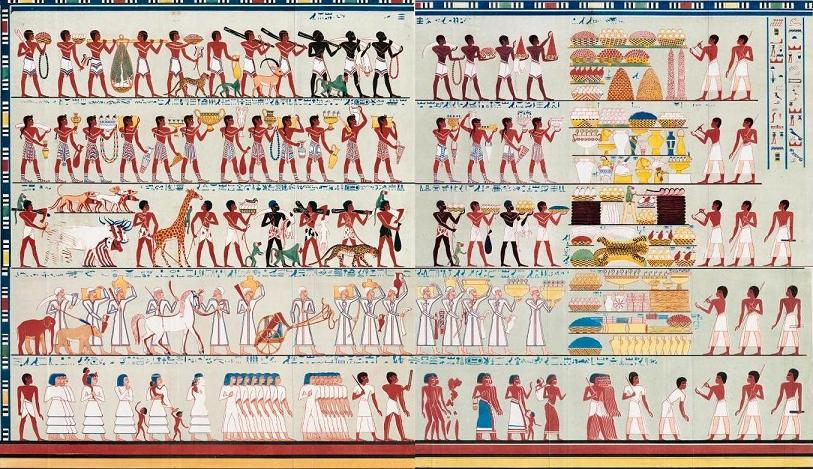
Wildlife depicted in the tomb of Rekhmire

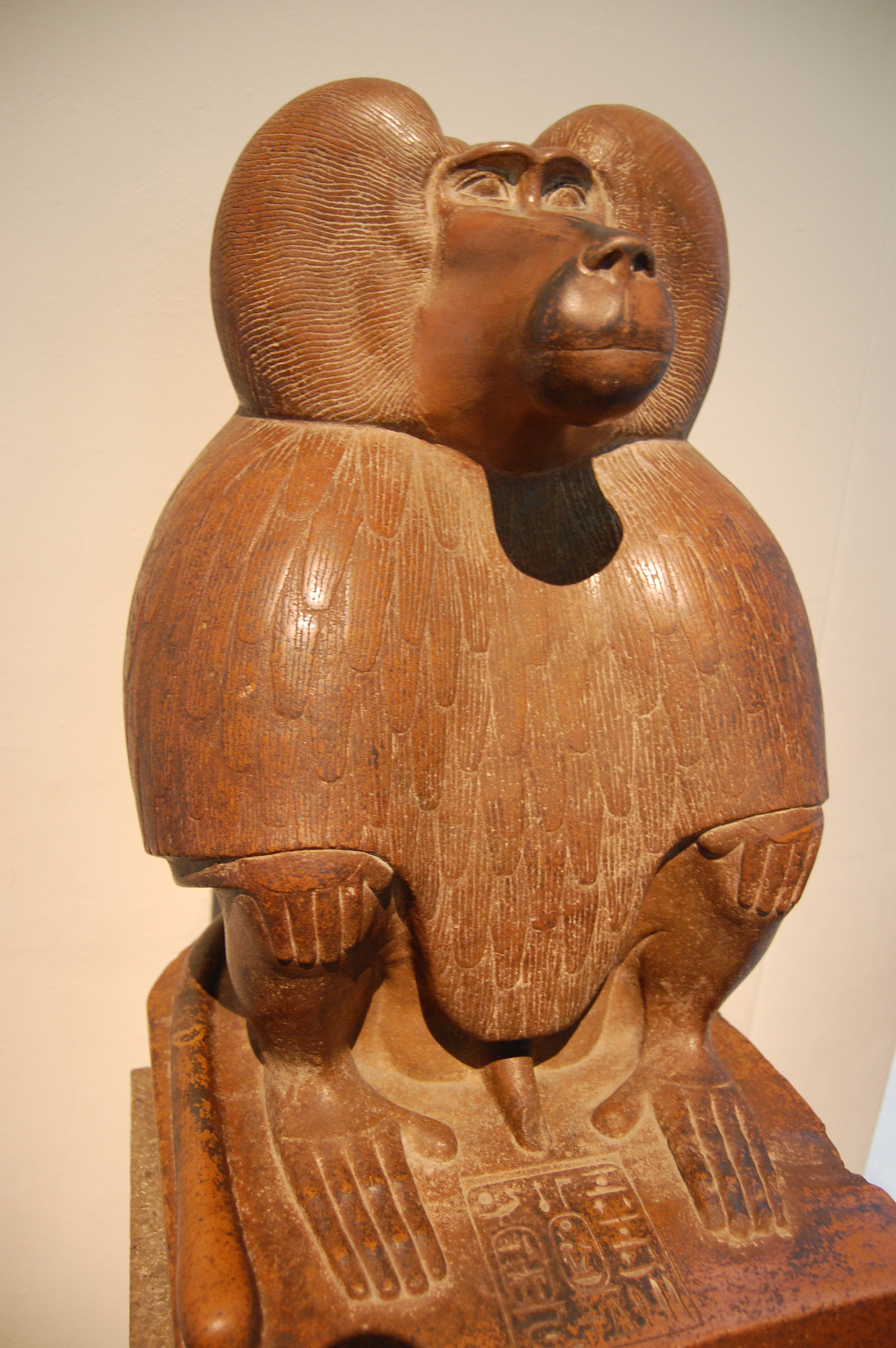
Hamadryas baboon statue depicted as the god Thoth in ancient Egyptian art

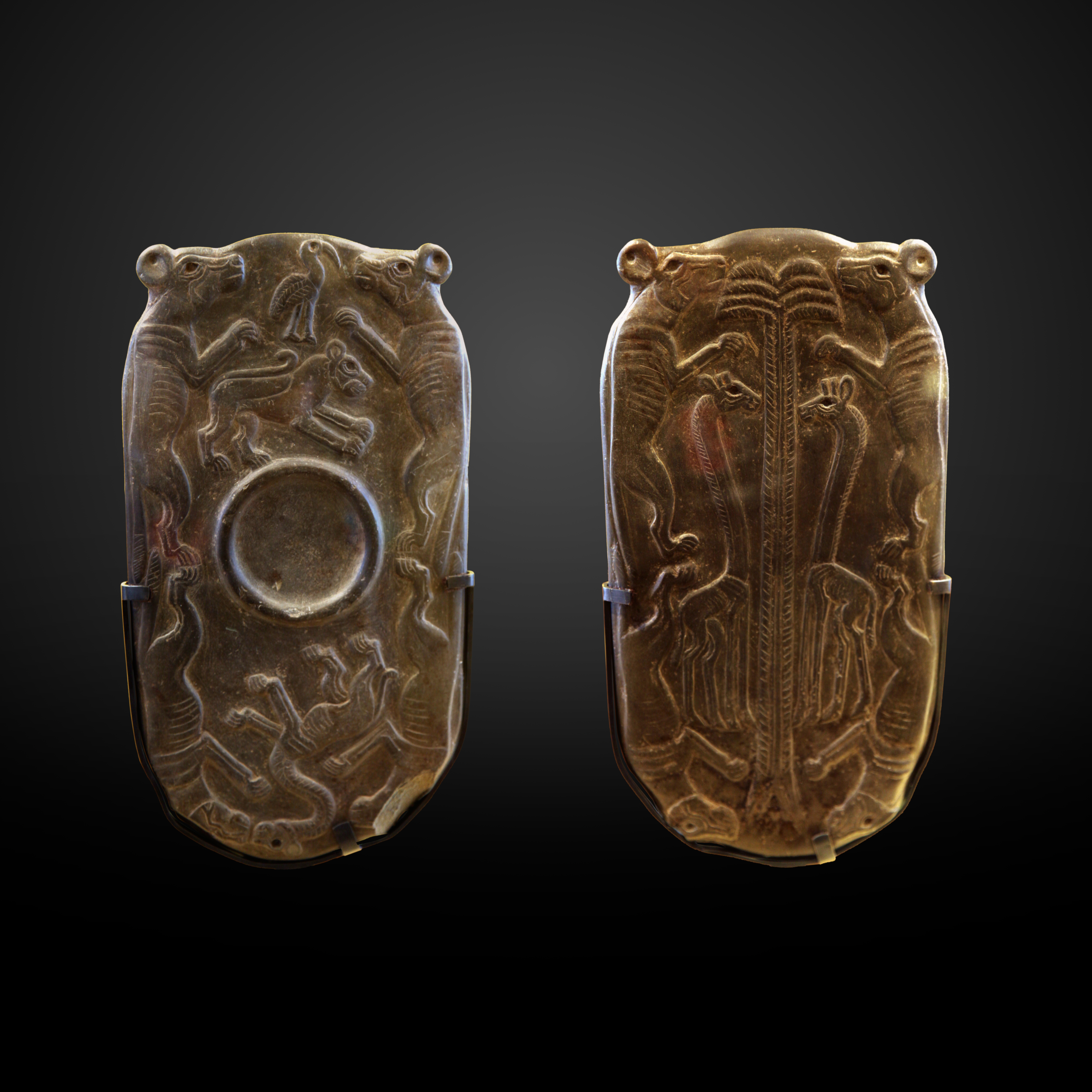
Cosmetic palette from the Naqada III period depicting African wild dogs

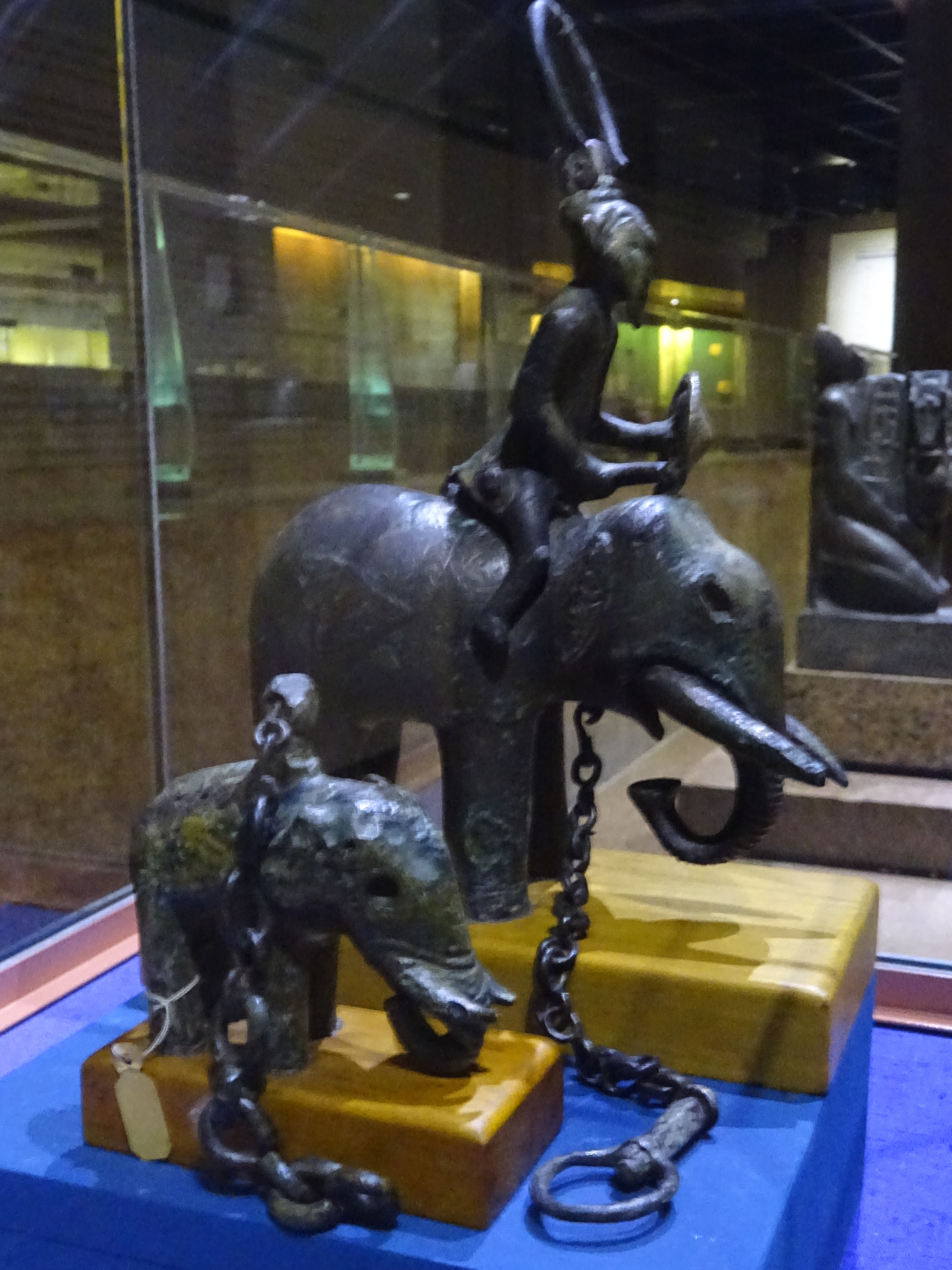
North African elephants depicted in Nubian art, Nubian Museum, Aswan

- Addax, Addax nasomaculatus
- African wild dog, Lycaon pictus EN
- Arabian oryx, Oryx leucoryx VU
- Barbary lion, Panthera leo leo EW
- Güldenstädt's shrew, Crocidura gueldenstaedtii LC
- Hamadryas baboon, Papio hamadryas LC
- Hippopotamus, Hippopotamus amphibius VU
- Persian fallow deer, Dama mesopotamica EN
- Scimitar oryx, Oryx dammah EN
- Syrian brown bear, Ursus arctos syriacus EN
- Wild boar, Sus scrofa LC
- Northern giraffe, Giraffa camelopardalis VU

== See also ==
- Wildlife of Egypt
- Animal welfare in Egypt
- List of chordate orders
- Lists of mammals by region
- Mammal classification
