= Botta's gerbil =

Conservation status
- Data Deficient (IUCN 3.1)

Scientific classification
- Kingdom: Animalia
- Phylum: Chordata
- Class: Mammalia
- Order: Rodentia
- Family: Muridae
- Genus: Dipodillus
- Species: D. bottai

Binomial name
- Dipodillus bottai (Lataste, 1882)

Synonyms
- Gerbillus bottai

Species of rodent

Botta's gerbil (Dipodillus bottai) is a species of gerbil endemic to Sudan and possibly northern Kenya. According to the International Union for Conservation of Nature, it was listed as Least Concern in 1996 until it was listed as Data Deficient in 2004. According to a 2013 book, it is known from a few specimens taken from four or five localities in a small area between the rivers White Nile and Blue Nile; its habitat is fields of vegetables and cereals. Aside from this information, nothing else is known about the species including its population and threats.

== Taxonomy ==
Botta's gerbil was first described by the French zoologist and herpetologist Fernand Lataste in 1882, he named it Gerbillus bottai. It is known from a small number of locations in Sudan, between the Blue Nile and the White Nile to the south of Khartoum, with some possible sightings in northern Kenya. It may form part of a species complex alongside the Khartoum gerbil (Dipodillus stigmonyx), Harwood's gerbil (Dipodillus harwoodi), and Waters's gerbil (Gerbillus watersi) . However, D. harwoodi has a separate range in Kenya about 1,200 km (746 mi) to the south of the other three species and further investigation may elevate it to full species status.

== Description ==
Botta's gerbil is a small species with sandy-brown upper parts with a blackish sheen, especially at the mid-line, and pure white underparts and limbs. The long tail is slightly bi-coloured, with dark hairs above and pale hairs below, the hairs at the tip forming a small tuft or pencil.
