= Emilius =

Emilius may refer to:

== People ==
- Saint Emilius (died 250), Christian martyr
- Emilius Ditlev Bærentzen (1799–1868), Danish painter
- Emilius Bangert (1883–1962), Danish composer, organist, and academic
- Emilius Bayley (1823–1917), English clergyman and cricketer
- Emilius R. Ciampa (1896–1996), American artist
- Émilius Goulet (born 1933), Canadian Roman Catholic archbishop
- Emilius Hopkinson (1869–1951), British aviculturist
- Emilius Seghers (1855–1927), bishop of Ghent
- Emilius Wagemans (1926–2011), Belgian singer

== Other uses ==
- Emilius (horse), a racehorse
- Monte Emilius, a mountain in the Graian Alps
- Mr. Emilius, a character in the novels Phineas Redux and The Eustace Diamonds by Anthony Trollope
- Emilius Jones, a character in the novel Bonfires and Broomsticks by Mary Norton.
- Prof. Emilius Brown, a character in Bedknobs and Broomsticks, based on the character directly above.

== See also ==
- Emil (given name)
