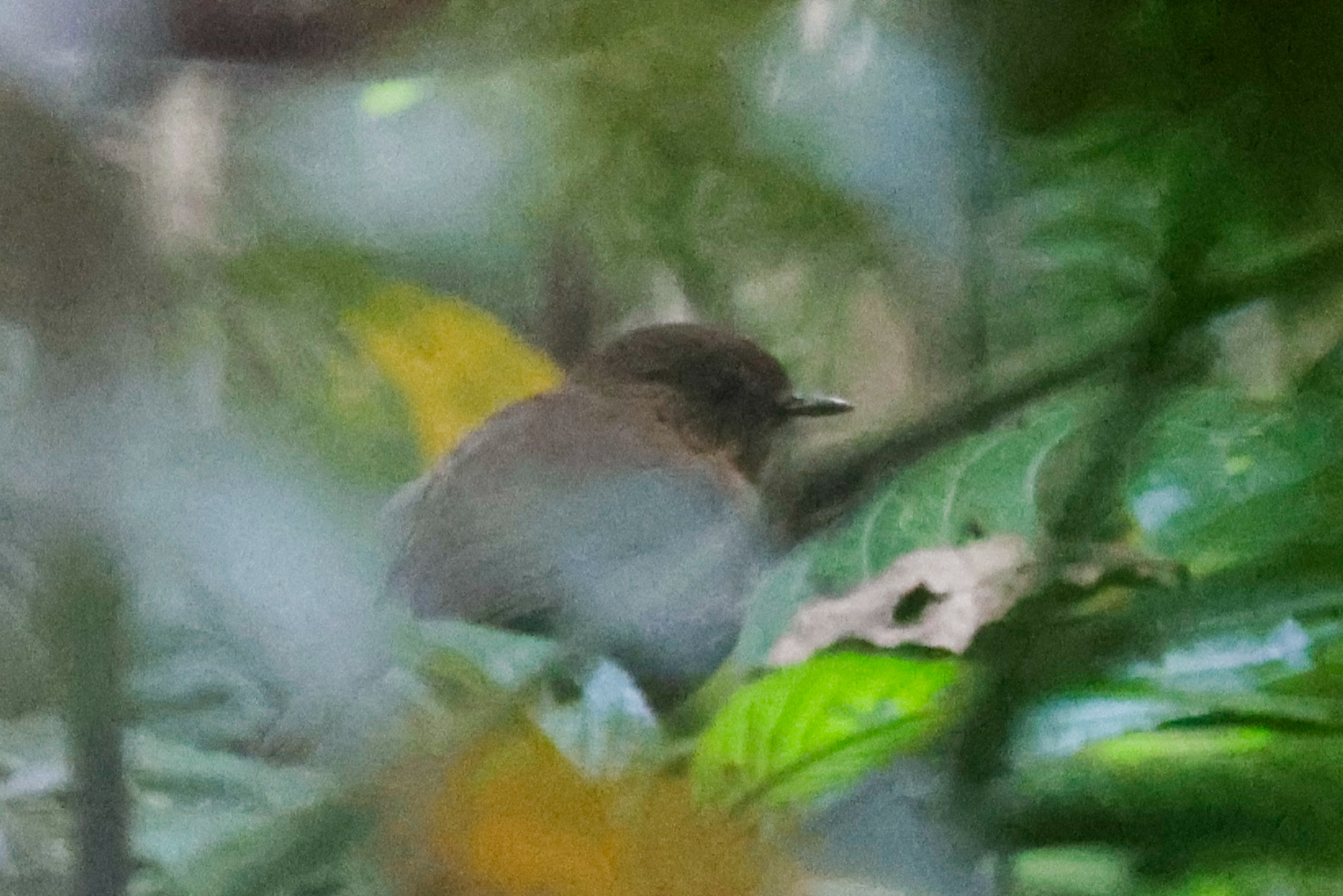

Conservation status
- Vulnerable (IUCN 3.1)

Scientific classification
- Kingdom: Animalia
- Phylum: Chordata
- Class: Aves
- Order: Passeriformes
- Family: Muscicapidae
- Genus: Sheppardia
- Species: S. lowei

Binomial name
- Sheppardia lowei (C. H. B. Grant & Mackworth-Praed, 1941)

= Iringa akalat =

Species of bird

The Iringa akalat (Sheppardia lowei) is a species of bird in the family Muscicapidae. It is endemic to Iringa Region of Tanzania. The species is named after the collector Willoughby Prescott Lowe.

Its natural habitat is subtropical or tropical moist montane forests. It is threatened by habitat loss.
