= Willoughby Prescott Lowe =

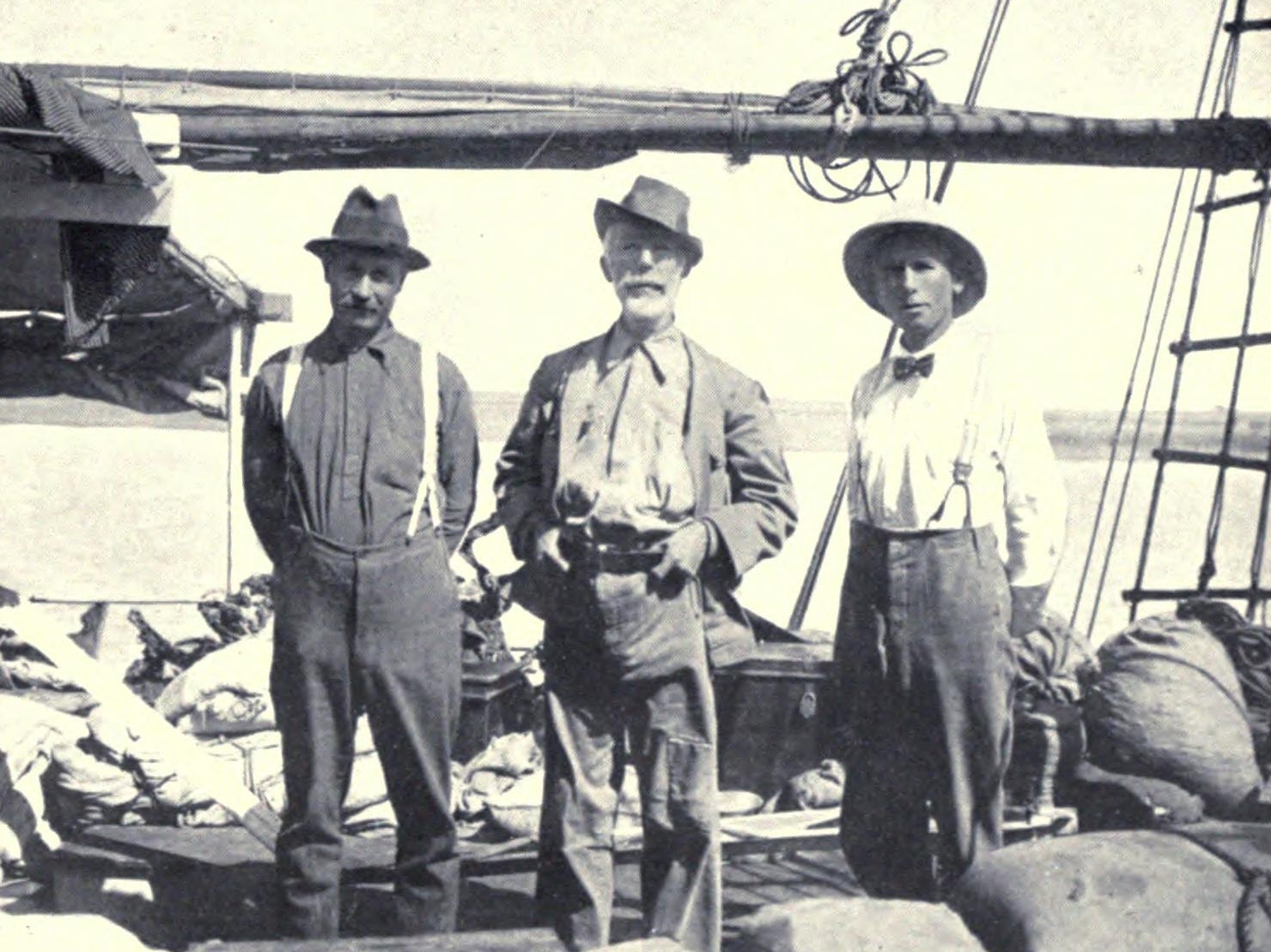
Lowe, Abel Chapman and Admiral Lynes in 1913-14

Willoughby Prescott Lowe (December 10, 1872 – October 31, 1949) was an English ornithologist, naturalist and professional specimen collector. He made collecting trips to Africa and South East Asia and contributed nearly 10,000 specimens to the Natural History Museum in London. The mammals Gerbillus lowei, Cercopithecus lowei, Cynogale lowei, Genetta servalina lowei, and the bird species Sheppardia lowei are among the taxa named in his honour.

== Life and work ==
Lowe was born to Pastor Edward Jackson Lowe (1825–1893) and Mary, née Wainright (1841–1880) in Tylers Green, Buckinghamshire. One of his brothers was later Pastor George Lincoln Gambier Lowe (1865–1833). He became interested in natural history and at the age of 17 he wrote to William Henry Flower (1831–1899) for advice on pursuing ornithology. In 1888 he went to the United States to visit a brother's sheep farm in Colorado. He also travelled around the United States and collected specimens in the Rocky Mountains. In 1895 he married Annie, daughter of Captain John Seals. In 1897 he returned to England and in 1907 he joined an expedition to the Philippines via Colombo and Hong Kong. On this expedition he described 82 new species. In 1910 he joined Captain Ernest Clifford Hardy (1866–1934) to west and southeast Africa. The ornithological results from the expedition were written by David Armitage Bannerman (1886–1979). In 1912 he joined Captain Gordon Philip Lewes Cosens (1884–1928) to East Africa and the results were examined by Claude Henry Baxter Grant. He travelled with Abel Chapman and Admiral Lynes to Sudan in 1913-14. In 1922 he wrote about his experiences in a book The Trail is Always New which included illustrations by Henrik Grönvold and his second son John Patrick Lowe (1910–1931) who was drowned in an accident. He travelled through Lagos and Gambia with Herbert Ronald Hardy (1900–1954) in that same year. He also visited Darfur, Kordofan and the Nuba Mountains with Lynes. He joined Arthur Stannard Vernay into Burma and Thailand. In 1925 he joined Bannerman into Tunisia. In 1947 he wrote The End of the Trail. He joined an expedition to Madagascar and made four visits to Indo-China along with Jean Delacour and Pierre Charles Edmond Jabouille (1875–1947) between 1925 and 1928. In 1928 he visited Gambia in collaboration with Emilius Hopkinson (1869–1951). In 1931 he joined Richard Meinertzhagen into the Hoggar Mountains in the Sahara desert. In 1933-34 he travelled to Ghana and Tanganyika along with Miss Fannie Waldron (1876–1959). After retiring from active collecting, he worked as an honorary curator at the Royal Albert Museum, Exeter. He served in World War I where he lost an eye and he became completely blind following an accident during a air-raid blackout in World War II. In 1948 he was awarded a B.O.U. Medal. He died following a surgical procedure.
