= Kerkennah Islands gerbil =

Scientific classification
- Domain: Eukaryota
- Kingdom: Animalia
- Phylum: Chordata
- Class: Mammalia
- Order: Rodentia
- Family: Muridae
- Genus: Dipodillus
- Species: D. zakariai

Binomial name
- Dipodillus zakariai Cockrum, Vaughn, Vaughn, 1976

Species of rodent

The Kerkennah Islands gerbil (Dipodillus zakariai) is a rodent from Kerkennah Islands, Tunisia.
