= McIntyre's horseshoe bat =

Conservation status
- Data Deficient (IUCN 3.1)

Scientific classification
- Kingdom: Animalia
- Phylum: Chordata
- Class: Mammalia
- Order: Chiroptera
- Family: Rhinolophidae
- Genus: Rhinolophus
- Species: R. mcintyrei

Binomial name
- Rhinolophus mcintyrei Hill & Schlitter, 1982

Synonyms
- Rhinolophus arcuatus mcintyrei Hill & Schlitter, 1982

Species of bat

McIntyre's horseshoe bat (Rhinolophus mcintyrei) is a species of horseshoe bat that is endemic to Papua New Guinea.

== Taxonomy ==
It was described as a subspecies of the arcuate horseshoe bat (R. arcuatus) in 1982 by J. E. Hill and D. A. Schlitter. The holotype had been collected in 1980 in a limestone cave in Telefomin, Papua New Guinea. They gave it the trinomen of R. arcuatus mcintyrei. The eponym for the subspecies name "mcintyrei" is Thomas McIntyre, thus honored for his support and appreciation of Australasian mammal research. In 2013, Patrick et al. published that R. a. mcintyrei should be considered a full species on the basis of differences in mitochondrial DNA.

== Description ==
The fur of its back is medium-brown, with individual hairs bicolored: hairs are whitish at the base and brown at the tip. The fur of its belly is paler in color than its back. It has large, broad ears with pointed tips. Males have an average weight of 13.5 g (0.48 oz), while females have an average weight of 13.8 g (0.49 oz).

== Range and habitat ==
R. mcintyrei is endemic to Papua New Guinea, where it is documented in forest habitats. It has been documented at altitudes from 270–1,600 m (890–5,250 ft) above sea level.
