= Lowe's gerbil =

Conservation status
- Data Deficient (IUCN 3.1)

Scientific classification
- Kingdom: Animalia
- Phylum: Chordata
- Class: Mammalia
- Order: Rodentia
- Family: Muridae
- Genus: Dipodillus
- Species: D. lowei

Binomial name
- Dipodillus lowei (Thomas & Hinton, 1923)

Species of rodent

Lowe's gerbil (Dipodillus lowei) is distributed mainly in Sudan; Jebel Marra. Less than 250 individuals of this species are thought to persist in the wild. It is named after the collector Willoughby Prescott Lowe.
