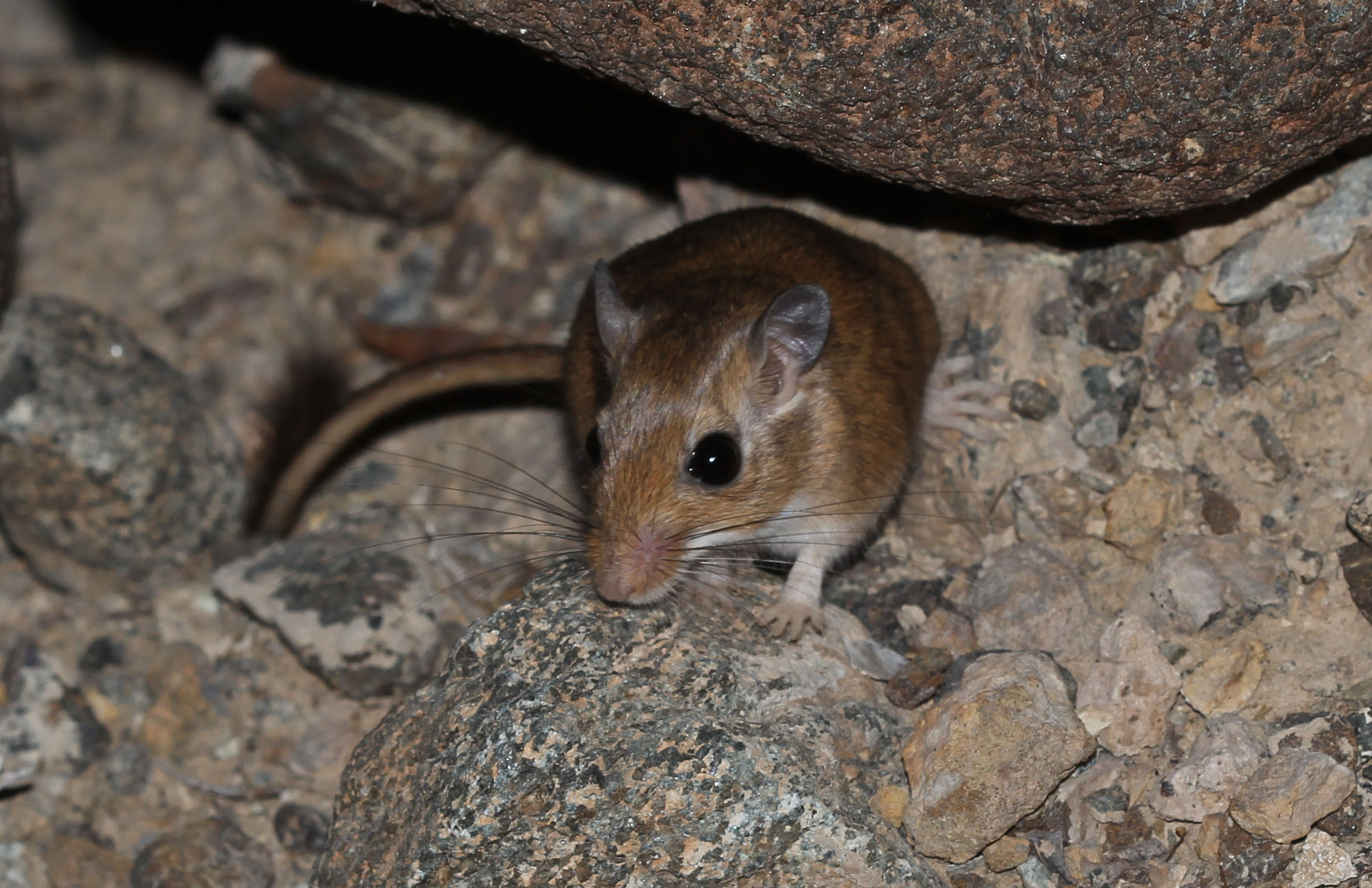

Conservation status
- Least Concern (IUCN 3.1)

Scientific classification
- Kingdom: Animalia
- Phylum: Chordata
- Class: Mammalia
- Order: Rodentia
- Family: Muridae
- Genus: Dipodillus
- Species: D. dasyurus

Binomial name
- Dipodillus dasyurus (Wagner, 1842)

Synonyms
- Gerbillus dasyurus

= Wagner's gerbil =

Species of rodent

Wagner's gerbil (Dipodillus dasyurus) is a gerbil that is native mainly to the Nile Delta, Israel, the Sinai, Syria, Iraq and the Arabian Peninsula. It also referred to as the rough-tailed dipodil or Wadi Hof gerbil. They are solo, burrowing mammals that are nocturnally active.
