= Greater short-tailed gerbil =

Conservation status
- Least Concern (IUCN 3.1)

Scientific classification
- Kingdom: Animalia
- Phylum: Chordata
- Class: Mammalia
- Order: Rodentia
- Family: Muridae
- Genus: Dipodillus
- Species: D. maghrebi

Binomial name
- Dipodillus maghrebi (Schlitter and Setzer, 1972)

Species of rodent

The greater short-tailed gerbil (Dipodillus maghrebi) is a rodent found mainly in Morocco.
