= Duane Albert Schlitter =

American mammalogist

Duane A. Schlitter
- Born: Duane Albert Schlitter; April 2, 1942 (age 84); Monona County, Iowa, United States
- Education: Wartburg College; University of Kansas; University of Maryland, College Park
- Known for: Research on mammalian systematics, biogeography, and ecology
- Awards: Hartley H. T. Jackson Award (2018)
- Scientific career
- Fields: Mammalogy
- Workplaces: Smithsonian Institution; Carnegie Museum of Natural History; Texas A&M University
- Doctoral advisor: Richard Highton

Duane Albert Schlitter (born April 2, 1942) is an American mammalogist whose research has focused on the systematics, evolution, biogeography, and ecology of mammals, particularly those of Africa and southwestern Asia.

== Biography ==
Schlitter married Judith E. Spratt in 1963. They have two daughters, Tamara and Tanya. He received a Bachelor of Arts degree from Wartburg College in 1965 and a Master of Arts degree from the University of Kansas in 1969. His master's thesis was titled Bats of the family Phyllostomatidae from the lesser Antillean Island of Dominica. In 1976, he received a Ph.D. from the University of Maryland, College Park, with a dissertation titled Taxonomy, zoogeography and evolutionary relationships of hairy-footed gerbils, Gerbillus (Gerbillus), of Africa and Asia (Mammalia: Rodentia). His doctoral advisor was Richard Highton.

From 1967 to 1972, Schlitter worked as a researcher and curatorial assistant with the African Mammal Project at the Smithsonian Institution. From 1973 to 1984, he was associate curator of mammals at the Carnegie Museum of Natural History in Pittsburgh. He became senior curator in 1985 and held the position until 1996. From 1997 to 1998, he served as executive director at Museum Park in Pretoria, South Africa, and as curator of birds and mammals at the Texas Cooperative Wildlife Collection (TCWC) in the Department of Wildlife and Fisheries Sciences at Texas A&M University in College Station, Texas.

Schlitter's research has covered mammalian systematics, evolution, biogeography, and ecology, particularly in Africa and southwestern Asia. His work has also addressed relationships among diseases, ectoparasite vectors, and mammalian hosts in the Old World, as well as the systematics and biogeography of mammals in eastern North America. Another area of interest has been the conservation of threatened mammal species in Africa and South Asia.

Schlitter has been a member of the American Society of Mammalogists, where he served in the treasurer's secretariat from 1977 to 1980. He has also been associated with the Society of Systematic Biologists, formerly the Society of Systematic Zoology, Sigma Xi, the American Association for the Advancement of Science, and the Zoological Society of Southern Africa.

In 2005, Schlitter contributed entries on elephant shrews, aardvarks, and pangolins to the reference work Mammal Species of the World.

== Taxa described by Duane A. Schlitter ==
The following taxa were described by Schlitter, either alone or in collaboration with other zoologists:

- Gerbillurus setzeri — Schlitter, 1973
- Rhinolophus mcintyrei — Hill & Schlitter, 1982
- Glauconycteris curryae — Eger & Schlitter, 2001
- Gerbillus aquilus — Schlitter & Setzer, 1972
- Dipodillus maghrebi — Schlitter & Setzer, 1972
- Calomyscus grandis — Schlitter & Setzer, 1973
- Sylvisorex pluvialis — Hutterer & Schlitter, 1996
- Aselliscus tricuspidatus subsp. novaeguinae — Schlitter, Williams & Hill, 1983
- Aselliscus tricuspidatus subsp. koopmani — Schlitter, Williams & Hill, 1983
- Eptesicus hottentotus subsp. portavernus — Schlitter & Aggundey, 1986

== Awards and eponyms ==
In 2018, Schlitter received the Hartley H. T. Jackson Award from the American Society of Mammalogists in recognition of his contributions to the society and the field of mammalogy.

In 2009, Julian Kerbis Peterhans, William T. Stanley, Rainer Hutterer, Terrence C. Demos, and Bernard Agwanda named the Mount Elgon shrew (Surdisorex schlitteri), a species of shrew from Kenya, in his honor.
