= Rupicolous gerbil =

Conservation status
- Data Deficient (IUCN 3.1)

Scientific classification
- Kingdom: Animalia
- Phylum: Chordata
- Class: Mammalia
- Order: Rodentia
- Family: Muridae
- Genus: Dipodillus
- Species: D. rupicola

Binomial name
- Dipodillus rupicola (Granjon, Aniskin, Bolobouev & Sicard, 2002)

Species of rodent

The rupicolous gerbil (Dipodillus rupicola) is a species of rodent in the family Muridae. It is found only in Mali. Its natural habitats are dry savanna and rocky areas.
