= Khartoum gerbil =

Conservation status
- Data Deficient (IUCN 3.1)

Scientific classification
- Kingdom: Animalia
- Phylum: Chordata
- Class: Mammalia
- Order: Rodentia
- Family: Muridae
- Genus: Dipodillus
- Species: D. stigmonyx

Binomial name
- Dipodillus stigmonyx (Heuglin, 1877)

Species of rodent

The Khartoum gerbil (Dipodillus stigmonyx) is found mainly in Sudan.
