= Mackilligin's gerbil =

Conservation status
- Least Concern (IUCN 3.1)

Scientific classification
- Kingdom: Animalia
- Phylum: Chordata
- Class: Mammalia
- Order: Rodentia
- Family: Muridae
- Genus: Dipodillus
- Species: D. mackilligini

Binomial name
- Dipodillus mackilligini (Thomas, 1904)

Synonyms
- Dipodillus mackilligini; Gerbillus mackilligini

Species of rodent

Mackilligin's gerbil (Dipodillus mackilligini) also known as Mackilligin's dipodil, is a species of rodent in the family Muridae. It occurs in the southeastern deserts of Egypt and Sudan, around the area of the Halaib Triangle. It has been grouped with Dipodillus nanus, but is now considered specifically distinct.
