= Claude H. B. Grant =

English ornithologist and military officer

Captain Claude Henry Baxter Grant (24 December 1878 – 9 January 1958) was an English ornithologist and military officer who collected birds in Africa and later worked at the bird room of the British Museum of Natural History (now the Natural History Museum).

Grant was born in London to Henry and Clare Elizabeth Grant. He was educated at Westbourne Schools, Latimer Grammar School, and at Blackers. where he met where he came to meet Reverend Theodore Wood. He then went to London University studying field surveying and worked with Edward Ayearst Reeves at the Royal Geographical Society. He trained in taxidermy and worked at the Natural History Museum and in 1899 he joined the Imperial Yeomanry for the Boer War. Here, between the hostilities, he made a collection of birds and mammals at Deelfontein. In 1903 he took up work as a collector for museums and made trips across Namaqualand to Transvall, Zululand and Portuguese East Africa. He returned to England with the collections, which were examined by W. L. Sclater. In 1908 he made a visit to South America, staying on until 1910 to collect across Argentina, Paraguay, Bolivia and the Matto Grosso. He published his findings in the Ibis in 1911 and 1912. He received a silver medal for his work from the British Ornithologists' Union in 1912. He later examined the collections of Captain Cozens and Willoughby Lowe. In 1914 he again joined military service in the East African Expeditionary Force and after the war, he served in the administration of Tanganyika from 1919 to 1932. He married Lena Harriet Priestly in 1915 and she accompanied him to Africa. He returned to England in 1932 and began to work on a book on the birds of Africa in collaboration with C. W. Mackworth-Praed. The multi-volume work itself was published only in 1970, going into seven volumes. Grant was also a keen hunter and wrote a guide to hunting.
