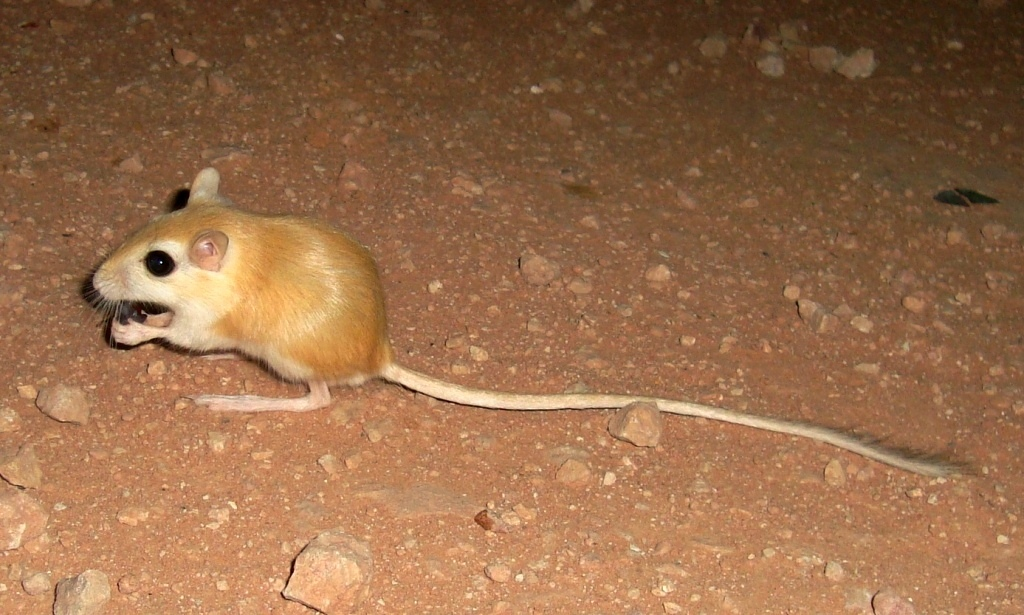
- Dipodillus campestris - North African gerbil

Scientific classification
- Kingdom: Animalia
- Phylum: Chordata
- Class: Mammalia
- Order: Rodentia
- Family: Muridae
- Tribe: Gerbillini
- Genus: Dipodillus; Lataste, 1881

Type species
- Gerbillus(Dipodillus) simoni

Species
- Dipodillus bottai Dipodillus campestris Dipodillus dasyurus Dipodillus harwoodi Dipodillus jamesi Dipodillus lowei Dipodillus mackilligini Dipodillus maghrebi Dipodillus rupicola Dipodillus simoni Dipodillus somalicus Dipodillus stigmonyx Dipodillus zakariai

= Dipodillus =

Genus of rodents

Dipodillus is a genus of rodent in the family Muridae. It is sometimes classified as a subgenus of the genus Gerbillus.

It contains the following species:

- Botta's gerbil (Dipodillus bottai)
- North African gerbil (Dipodillus campestris)
- Wagner's gerbil (Dipodillus dasyurus)
- Harwood's gerbil (Dipodillus harwoodi)
- James's gerbil (Dipodillus jamesi)
- Lowe's gerbil (Dipodillus lowei)
- Mackilligin's gerbil (Dipodillus mackilligini)
- Greater short-tailed gerbil (Dipodillus maghrebi)
- Rupicolous gerbil (Dipodillus rupicola)
- Lesser short-tailed gerbil (Dipodillus simoni)
- Somalian gerbil (Dipodillus somalicus)
- Khartoum gerbil (Dipodillus stigmonyx)
- Kerkennah Islands gerbil (Dipodillus zakariai)
