= James's gerbil =

Conservation status
- Data Deficient (IUCN 3.1)

Scientific classification
- Kingdom: Animalia
- Phylum: Chordata
- Class: Mammalia
- Order: Rodentia
- Family: Muridae
- Genus: Dipodillus
- Species: D. jamesi

Binomial name
- Dipodillus jamesi (Harrison, 1967)

Species of rodent

James's gerbil (Dipodillus jamesi) is a species of rodent endemic to the eastern coast of Tunisia.
