= Emilius Hopkinson =

- Born: March 31, 1869
- Died: June 11, 1951 (aged 82)
- Allegiance: United Kingdom
- Branch: British Army
- Commands: 15th Battalion, Imperial Yeomanry
- Conflicts: First World War
- Education: Trinity College, Oxford

Emilius Hopkinson CMG DSO (31 March 1869 – 11 Jun 1951) was the son of Jonathan Hopkinson (1811–1882) and Emily Elizabeth née Cutbill (1838–1926). Educated at Haileybury, he graduated from Trinity College, Oxford and completed his medical training at St Thomas' Hospital, London. He was a Medical Officer, a Surgeon-Captain, in the 15th Battalion, Imperial Yeomanry in South Africa from 1900–01 where he was mentioned in dispatches, awarded the Queen’s Medal with four clasps and the DSO. From 1901–29 he served in the Gambia Protectorate, as a Medical Officer from 1901–11 and then as Travelling Commissioner, and was awarded the CMG in 1922.

He had a long interest in birds and aviculture and would bring live specimens back with him when on leave. After retirement, until the start of the Second World War, he would travel every winter to study bird migrations in West Africa and to visit warmer climes.

His friend David Bannerman named a sub-species of Ahanta spurfowl found in Gambia Pternistis ahantensis hopkinsoni after him in 1930.

He died in 1951 at his home in Balcombe, West Sussex, England.

== Works ==
- Hopkinson, Emilius (1919). A List of the Birds of Gambia.
- Hopkinson, Emilius (1926). Records of Birds Bred in Captivity. H. F. & G. Witherby.
- Hopkinson, Emilius (1925). Notes on Protectorate Laws, Gambia.
- Hopkinson, Emilius (1928). Mandingo vocabulary with addenda.
