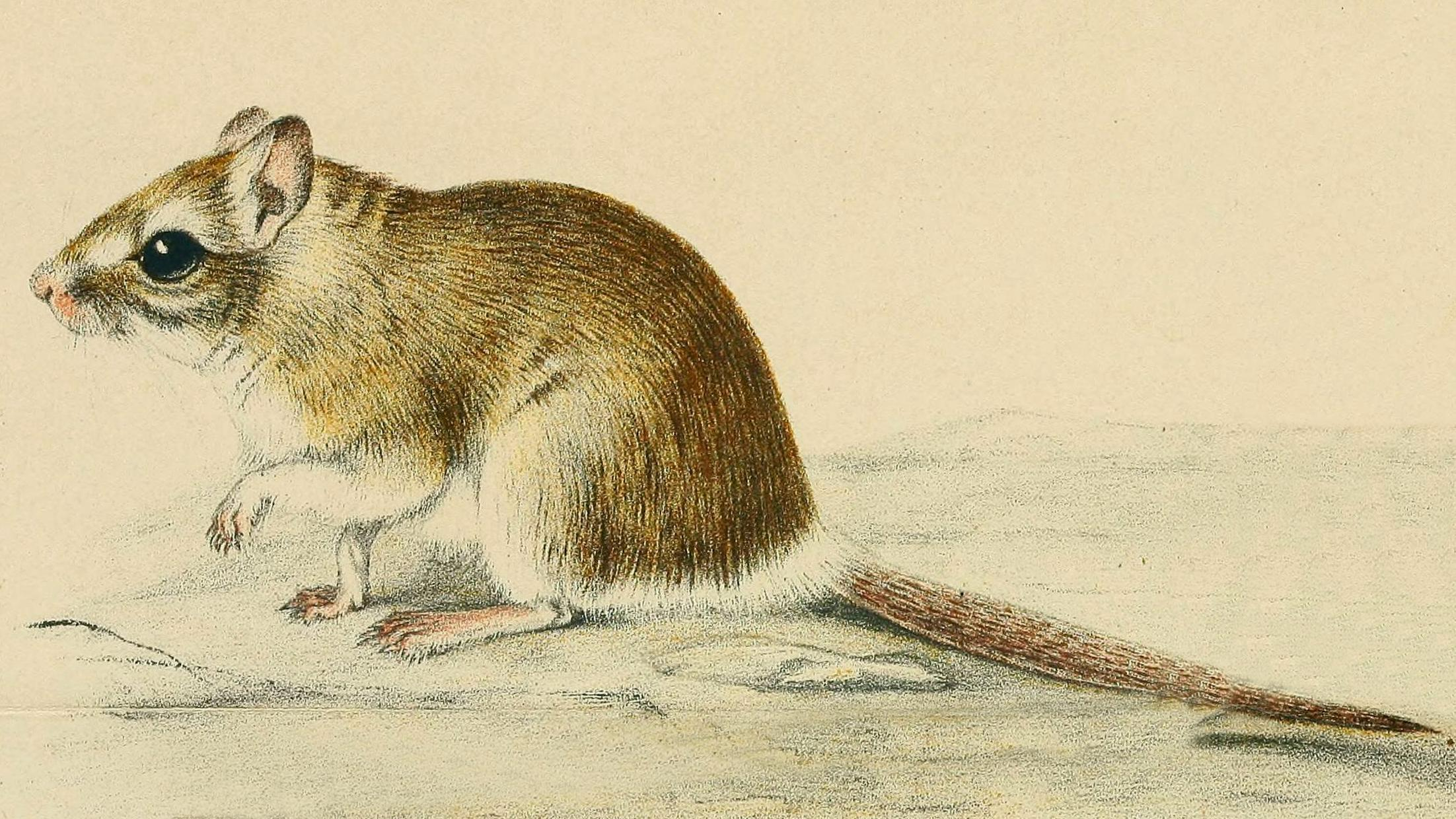

Conservation status
- Least Concern (IUCN 3.1)

Scientific classification
- Kingdom: Animalia
- Phylum: Chordata
- Class: Mammalia
- Order: Rodentia
- Family: Muridae
- Genus: Dipodillus
- Species: D. simoni

Binomial name
- Dipodillus simoni Lataste, 1881

= Lesser short-tailed gerbil =

Species of rodent

The lesser short-tailed gerbil (Dipodillus simoni) is distributed mainly from eastern Morocco to Egypt. It is also known as Simon's dipodil. After morphological and molecular studies in 2010 Dipodillus was ranged as a subgenus of Gerbillus, and Dipodillus simoni was renamed into Gerbillus simoni.
