= Harwood's gerbil =

Conservation status
- Least Concern (IUCN 3.1)

Scientific classification
- Kingdom: Animalia
- Phylum: Chordata
- Class: Mammalia
- Order: Rodentia
- Family: Muridae
- Genus: Gerbillus
- Species: G. harwoodi

Binomial name
- Gerbillus harwoodi (Thomas, 1901)

Synonyms
- Dipodillus harwoodi Thomas, 1901; Dipodillus luteus Dollman, 1914

Species of rodent

Harwood's gerbil (Gerbillus harwoodi) is a species of rodent in the subfamily Gerbillinae. It is native to Kenya and Tanzania.
