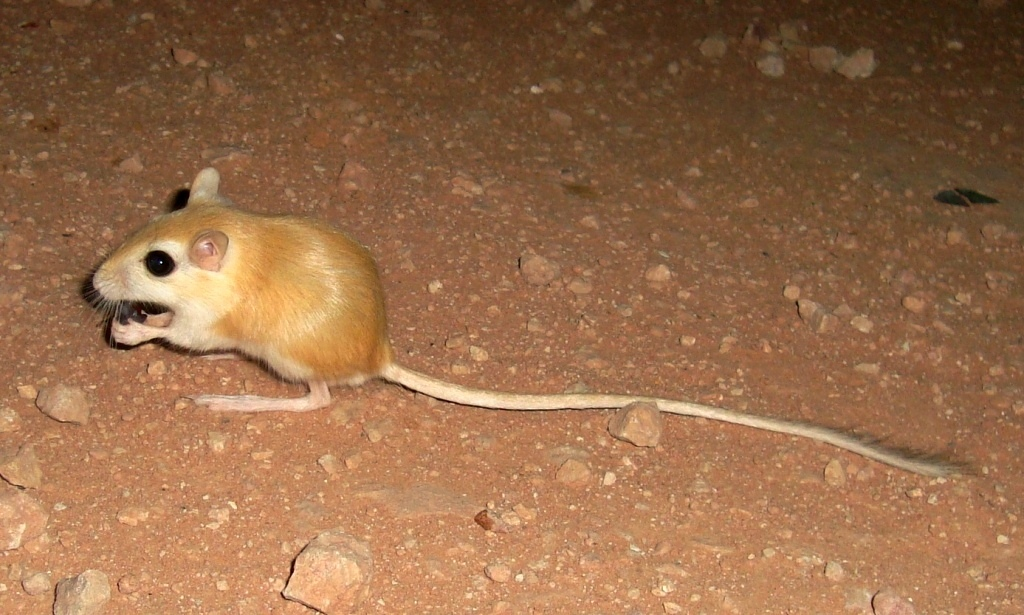
- Dipodillus campestris, Tiguentourine gas field, In Amenas, Algeria

Conservation status
- Least Concern (IUCN 3.1)

Scientific classification
- Kingdom: Animalia
- Phylum: Chordata
- Class: Mammalia
- Order: Rodentia
- Family: Muridae
- Genus: Dipodillus
- Species: D. campestris

Binomial name
- Dipodillus campestris (Levaillant, 1857)
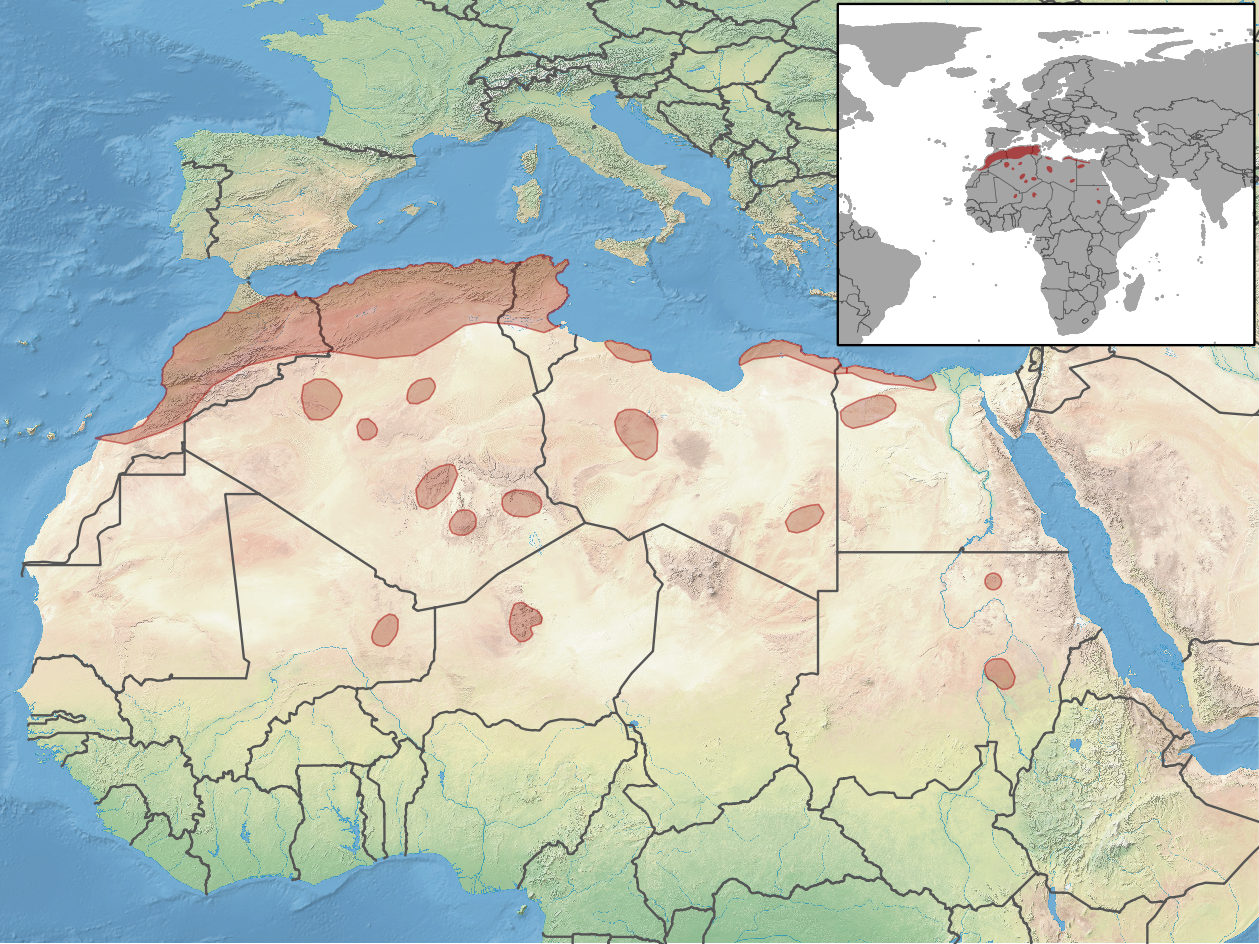

Synonyms
- Gerbillus campestris (Loche, 1867) quadrimaculatus (Lataste, 1882)

= North African gerbil =

Species of rodent

The North African gerbil (Dipodillus campestris) is a species of rodent in the family Muridae. It is found in North Africa where its natural habitats are arable land and rocky areas of the Maghreb, and hot Saharan deserts.

== Description ==
The North African gerbil has long soft fur and a relatively long tail. The dorsal fur is cinnamon to orange-brown. Each hair has a grey base, a sandy or golden-brown terminal section and often a black tip. The cheeks and throat are white and there is sometimes a dark stripe on the nose. The underparts are white, with a clear division between the dorsal and ventral colours. The legs and feet are white and the soles of the feet are bare. The tail is almost twice the length of the head-and-body, and is bicoloured, golden-brown above and white below. The tip of the tail forms a pencil, a tuft of longer hair.

== Distribution and habitat ==
The North African gerbil is found in Algeria, Egypt, Libya, Mali, Morocco, Niger, Sudan, Tunisia, and possibly Chad and Mauritania. Its habitat varies across its range, but in general it favours habitats with rocks and vegetation rather than sand and gravel .

== Ecology ==
The North African gerbil lives in a burrow that it digs and is a terrestrial and nocturnal animal. The timing of breeding depends on location, but in Egypt coincides with the winter rains, and in North Sudan follows the short wet season in September to November. The litter size is about five pups. The diet of this rodent has not been studied. The North African gerbil, part of the rodent family, is often considered a pest within its natural habitat. Erosion, urbanization, and agriculture are some of the most prominent threats to the North African gerbil and other African rodents. As a burrowing rodent, farmers often aim to harm North African gerbils as they pose threats to crop yields.

== Status ==
The North African gerbil is a common species that flourishes in a range of different environments and in some locations, such as in Morocco, it is reckoned to be an agricultural pest species. The International Union for Conservation of Nature has rated the conservation status of this rodent as being of "least concern".
