= List of mammals of Algeria =

This list of the mammal species recorded in Algeria provides information about the status of the 120 mammal species occurring in Algeria. Three are critically endangered, four are endangered, eight are vulnerable, four are near threatened, and one can longer be found in the wild.

The following tags are used to highlight each species' conservation status as assessed on the IUCN Red List:

| EX | Extinct | No reasonable doubt that the last individual has died. |
| EW | Extinct in the wild | Known only to survive in captivity or as a naturalized populations well outside its previous range. |
| CR | Critically endangered | The species is in imminent risk of extinction in the wild. |
| EN | Endangered | The species is facing an extremely high risk of extinction in the wild. |
| VU | Vulnerable | The species is facing a high risk of extinction in the wild. |
| NT | Near threatened | The species does not meet any of the criteria that would categorise it as risking extinction but it is likely to do so in the future. |
| LC | Least concern | There are no current identifiable risks to the species. |
| DD | Data deficient | There is inadequate information to make an assessment of the risks to this species. |

== Order: Macroscelidea (elephant shrews) ==
Often called sengis, the elephant shrews or jumping shrews are native to southern Africa. Their common English name derives from their elongated flexible snout and their resemblance to the true shrews.

- Family: Macroscelididae (elephant shrews)
  - Genus: Petrosaltator
    - North African elephant shrew, P. rozeti LC

== Order: Hyracoidea (hyraxes) ==
The hyraxes are any of four species of fairly small, thickset, herbivorous mammals in the order Hyracoidea. About the size of a domestic cat they are well-furred, with rounded bodies and a stumpy tail. They are native to Africa and the Middle East.

- Family: Procaviidae (hyraxes)
  - Genus: Procavia
    - Cape hyrax, P. capensis LC

== Order: Primates ==
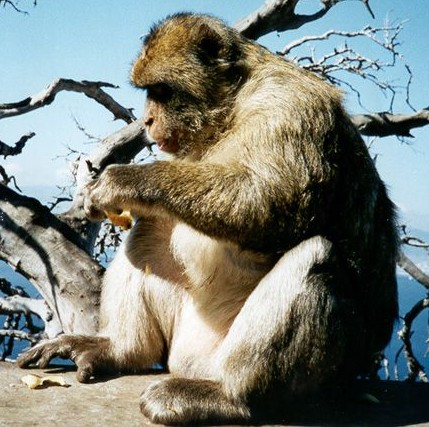
Barbary macaque

The order Primates contains humans and their closest relatives: lemurs, lorisoids, tarsiers, monkeys, and apes.

- Suborder: Haplorhini
  - Infraorder: Simiiformes
    - Parvorder: Catarrhini
      - Superfamily: Cercopithecoidea
        - Family: Cercopithecidae (Old World monkeys)
          - Genus: Macaca
            - Barbary macaque, M. sylvanus EN

== Order: Rodentia (rodents) ==
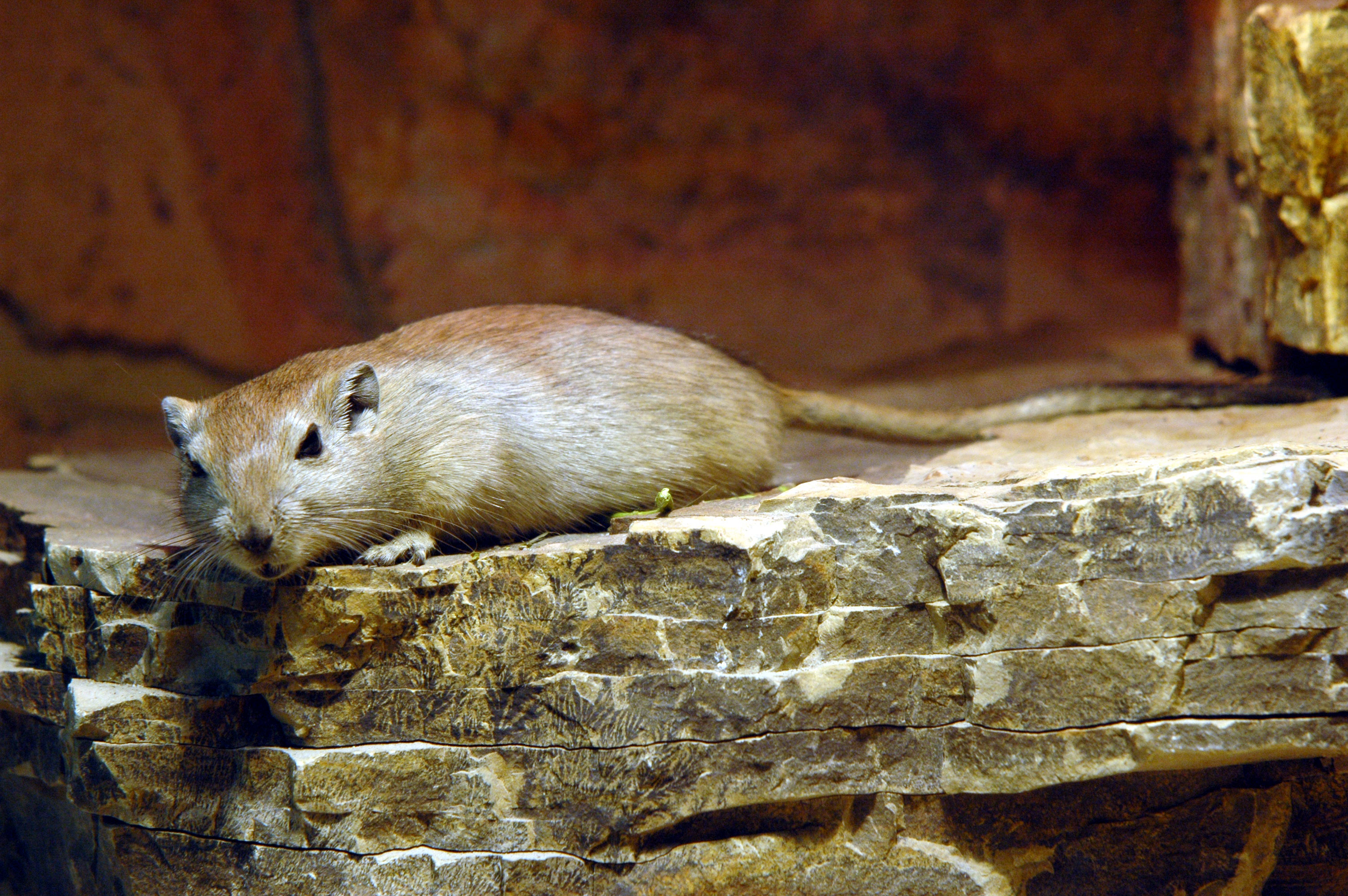
Sand rat

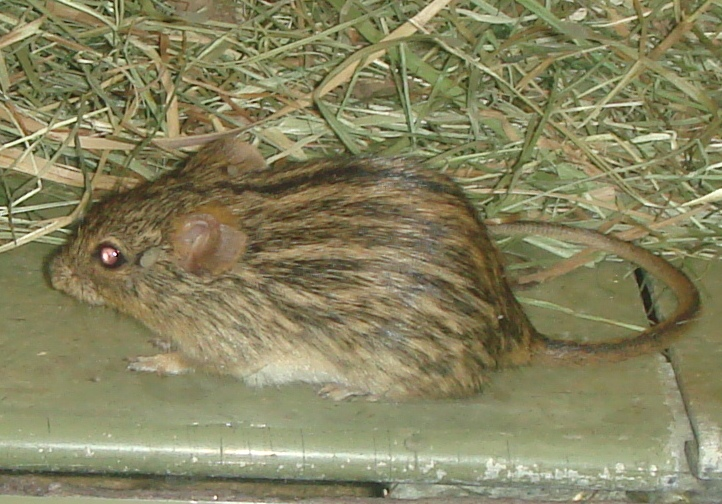
Barbary striped grass mouse

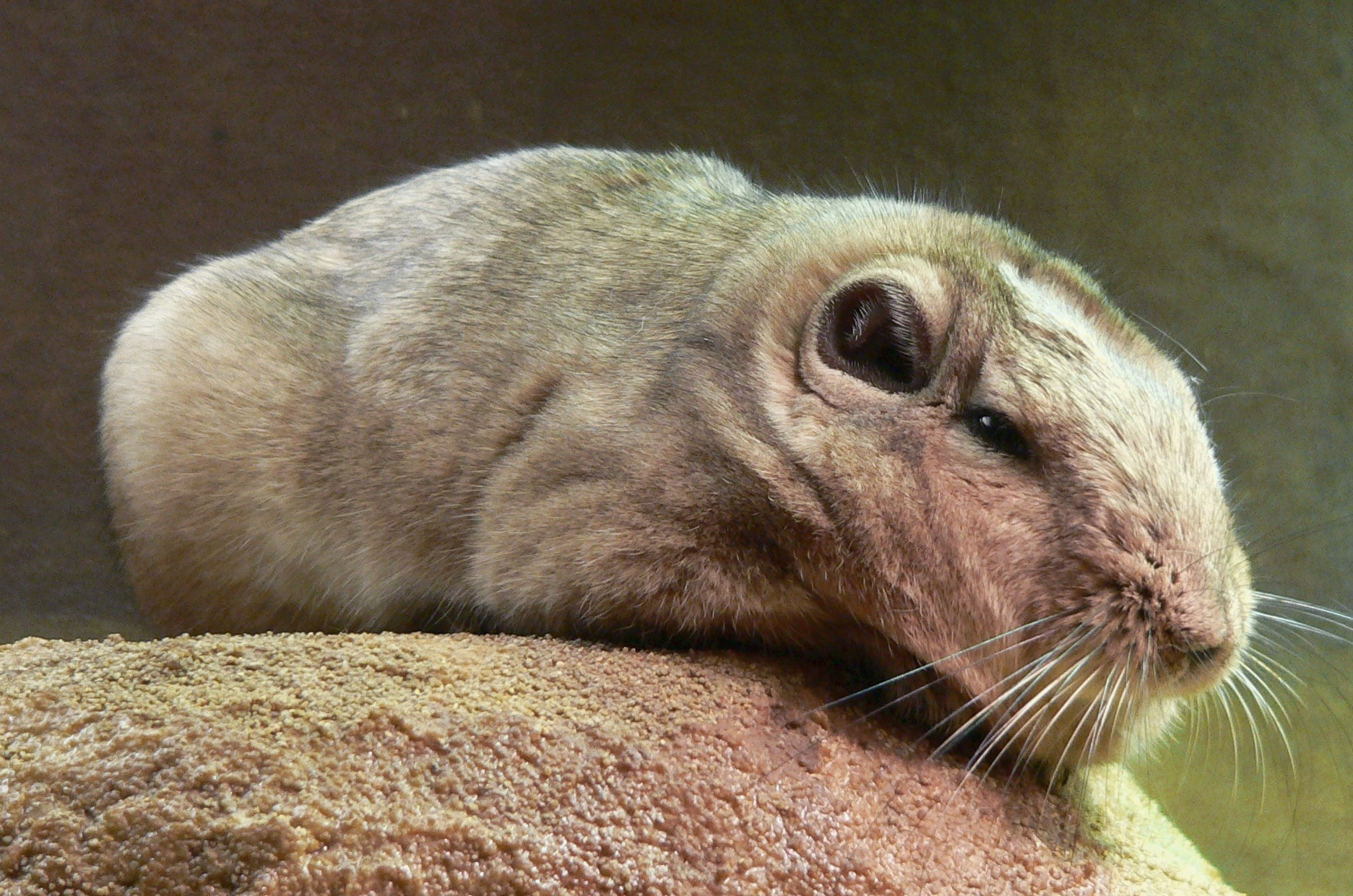
Gundi

Rodents make up the largest order of mammals, with over 40 percent of mammalian species. They have two incisors in the upper and lower jaw which grow continually and must be kept short by gnawing. Most rodents are small though the capybara can weigh up to 45 kg (100 lb).

- Suborder: Hystricomorpha
  - Family: Hystricidae (Old World porcupines)
    - Genus: Hystrix
      - Crested porcupine, Hystrix cristata LC
  - Family: Ctenodactylidae
    - Genus: Ctenodactylus
      - Common gundi, Ctenodactylus gundi LC
      - Val's gundi, Ctenodactylus vali DD
    - Genus: Massoutiera
      - Mzab gundi, Massoutiera mzabi LC
- Suborder: Sciurognathi
  - Family: Sciuridae (squirrels)
    - Subfamily: Xerinae
      - Genus: Atlantoxerus
        - Barbary ground squirrel, Atlantoxerus getulus LC
  - Family: Gliridae (dormice)
    - Subfamily: Leithiinae
      - Genus: Eliomys
        - Asian garden dormouse, Eliomys melanurus LC
        - Maghreb garden dormouse, Eliomys munbyanus LC
  - Family: Dipodidae (jerboas)
    - Subfamily: Dipodinae
      - Genus: Jaculus
        - Lesser Egyptian jerboa, Jaculus jaculus LC
        - Greater Egyptian jerboa, Jaculus orientalis LC
  - Family: Muridae (mice, rats, voles, gerbils, hamsters, etc.)
    - Subfamily: Deomyinae
      - Genus: Acomys
        - Seurat's spiny mouse, Acomys seurati LC
    - Subfamily: Gerbillinae
      - Genus: Dipodillus
        - North African gerbil, Dipodillus campestris LC
      - Genus: Gerbillus
        - Lesser Egyptian gerbil, Gerbillus gerbillus LC
        - Pygmy gerbil, Gerbillus henleyi LC
        - Balochistan gerbil, Gerbillus nanus LC
        - Lesser short-tailed gerbil, Gerbillus simoni LC
        - Tarabul's gerbil, Gerbillus tarabuli LC
      - Genus: Meriones
        - Sundevall's jird, Meriones crassus LC
        - Libyan jird, Meriones libycus LC
        - Shaw's jird, Meriones shawi LC
      - Genus: Pachyuromys
        - Fat-tailed gerbil, Pachyuromys duprasi LC
      - Genus: Psammomys
        - Fat sand rat, Psammomys obesus LC
        - Thin sand rat, Psammomys vexillaris DD
    - Subfamily: Murinae
      - Genus: Apodemus
        - Wood mouse, Apodemus sylvaticus LC
      - Genus: Lemniscomys
        - Barbary striped grass mouse, Lemniscomys barbarus LC
      - Genus: Mus
        - Algerian mouse, Mus spretus LC

== Order: Lagomorpha (lagomorphs) ==
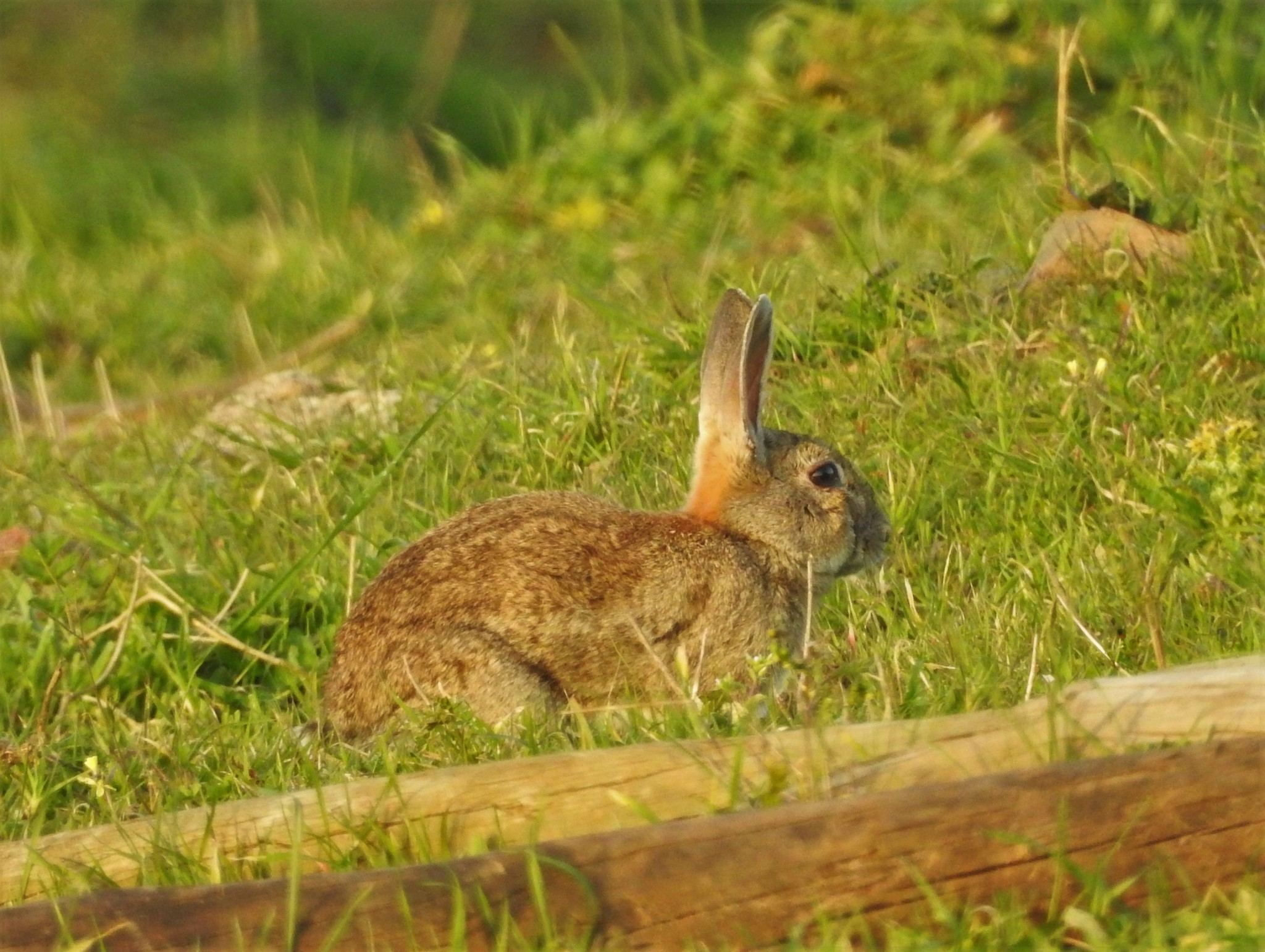
European rabbit

The lagomorphs comprise two families, Leporidae (hares and rabbits), and Ochotonidae (pikas). Though they can resemble rodents, and were classified as a superfamily in that order until the early 20th century, they have since been considered a separate order. They differ from rodents in a number of physical characteristics, such as having four incisors in the upper jaw rather than two.

- Family: Leporidae (rabbits, hares)
  - Genus: Oryctolagus
    - European rabbit, Oyctolagus cuniculus EN
  - Genus: Lepus
    - Cape hare, Lepus capensis LC
    - African savanna hare, Lepus victoriae LC

== Order: Erinaceomorpha (hedgehogs and gymnures) ==
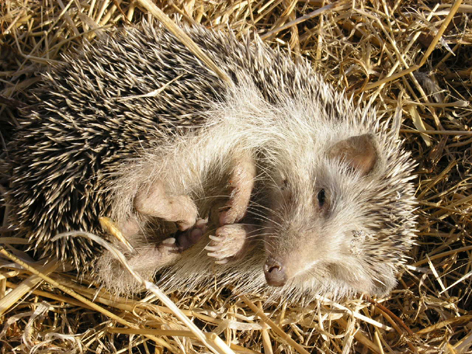
North African hedgehog

The order Erinaceomorpha contains a single family, Erinaceidae, which comprise the hedgehogs and gymnures. The hedgehogs are easily recognised by their spines while gymnures look more like large rats.

- Family: Erinaceidae (hedgehogs)
  - Subfamily: Erinaceinae
    - Genus: Atelerix
      - North African hedgehog, Atelerix algirus LC
    - Genus: Hemiechinus
      - Desert hedgehog, Hemiechinus aethiopicus LC

== Order: Soricomorpha (shrews, moles, and solenodons) ==
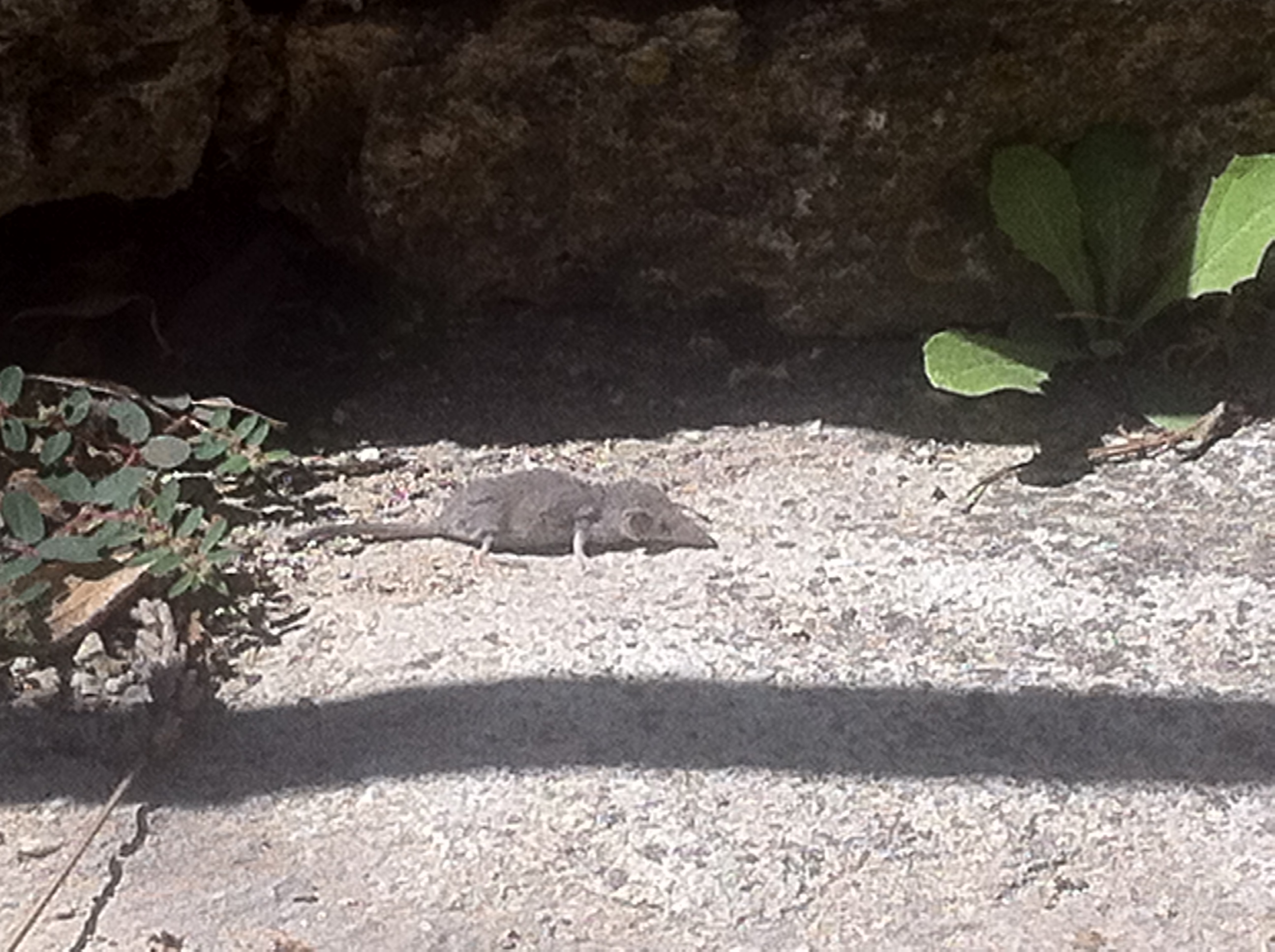
Etruscan shrew

The "shrew-forms" are insectivorous mammals. The shrews and solenodons closely resemble mice while the moles are stout-bodied burrowers.

- Family: Soricidae (shrews)
  - Subfamily: Crocidurinae
    - Genus: Crocidura
      - Mauritanian shrew, Crocidura lusitania LC
      - Greater white-toothed shrew, Crocidura russula LC
      - Whitaker's shrew, Crocidura whitakeri LC
    - Genus: Suncus
      - Etruscan shrew, Suncus etruscus LC

== Order: Chiroptera (bats) ==
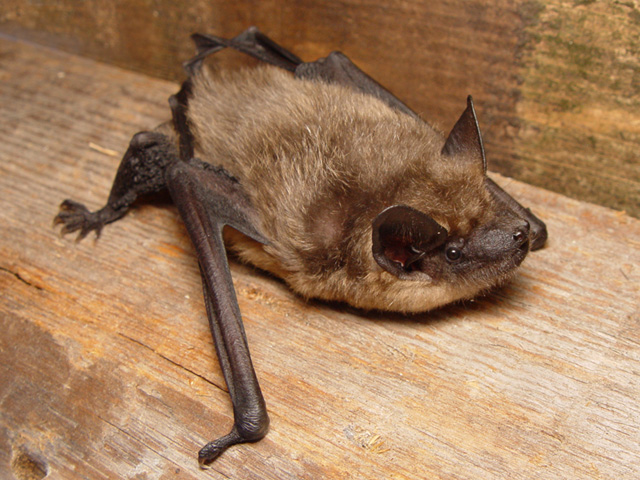
Serotine bat

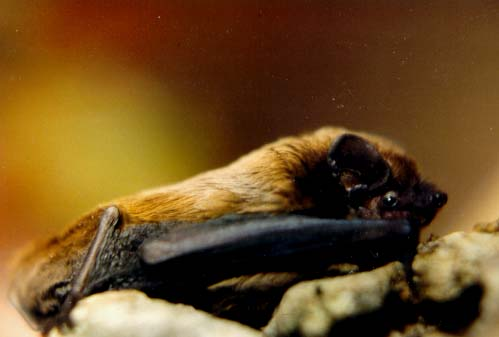
Lesser noctule

The bats' most distinguishing feature is that their forelimbs are developed as wings, making them the only mammals capable of flight. Bat species account for about 20% of all mammals.

- Family: Vespertilionidae
  - Subfamily: Myotinae
    - Genus: Myotis
      - Long-fingered bat, Myotis capaccinii VU
      - Geoffroy's bat, Myotis emarginatus LC
      - Felten's myotis, Myotis punicus DD
  - Subfamily: Vespertilioninae
    - Genus: Eptesicus
      - Serotine bat, Eptesicus serotinus LC
    - Genus: Hypsugo
      - Savi's pipistrelle, Hypsugo savii LC
    - Genus: Nyctalus
      - Greater noctule bat, Nyctalus lasiopterus VU
      - Lesser noctule, Nyctalus leisleri LC
    - Genus: Otonycteris
      - Desert long-eared bat, Otonycteris hemprichii LC
    - Genus: Pipistrellus
      - Egyptian pipistrelle, Pipistrellus deserti LC
      - Kuhl's pipistrelle, Pipistrellus kuhlii LC
      - Common pipistrelle, Pipistrellus pipistrellus LC
      - Rüppell's pipistrelle, Pipistrellus rueppelli LC
  - Subfamily: Miniopterinae
    - Genus: Miniopterus
      - Common bent-wing bat, M. schreibersii NT
- Family: Rhinopomatidae
  - Genus: Rhinopoma
    - Egyptian mouse-tailed bat, R. cystops LC
    - Lesser mouse-tailed bat, Rhinopoma hardwickei LC
    - Greater mouse-tailed bat, Rhinopoma microphyllum LC
- Family: Molossidae
  - Genus: Tadarida
    - Egyptian free-tailed bat, Tadarida aegyptiaca LC
    - European free-tailed bat, Tadarida teniotis LC
- Family: Emballonuridae
  - Genus: Taphozous
    - Naked-rumped tomb bat, Taphozous nudiventris LC
- Family: Rhinolophidae
  - Subfamily: Rhinolophinae
    - Genus: Asellia
      - Trident leaf-nosed bat, A. tridens LC
    - Genus: Rhinolophus
      - Blasius's horseshoe bat, R. blasii LC
      - Geoffroy's horseshoe bat, Rhinolophus clivosus LC
      - Mediterranean horseshoe bat, Rhinolophus euryale NT
      - Greater horseshoe bat, Rhinolophus ferrumequinum NT
      - Lesser horseshoe bat, Rhinolophus hipposideros NT
      - Mehely's horseshoe bat, Rhinolophus mehelyi VU

== Order: Cetacea (whales) ==
Orca

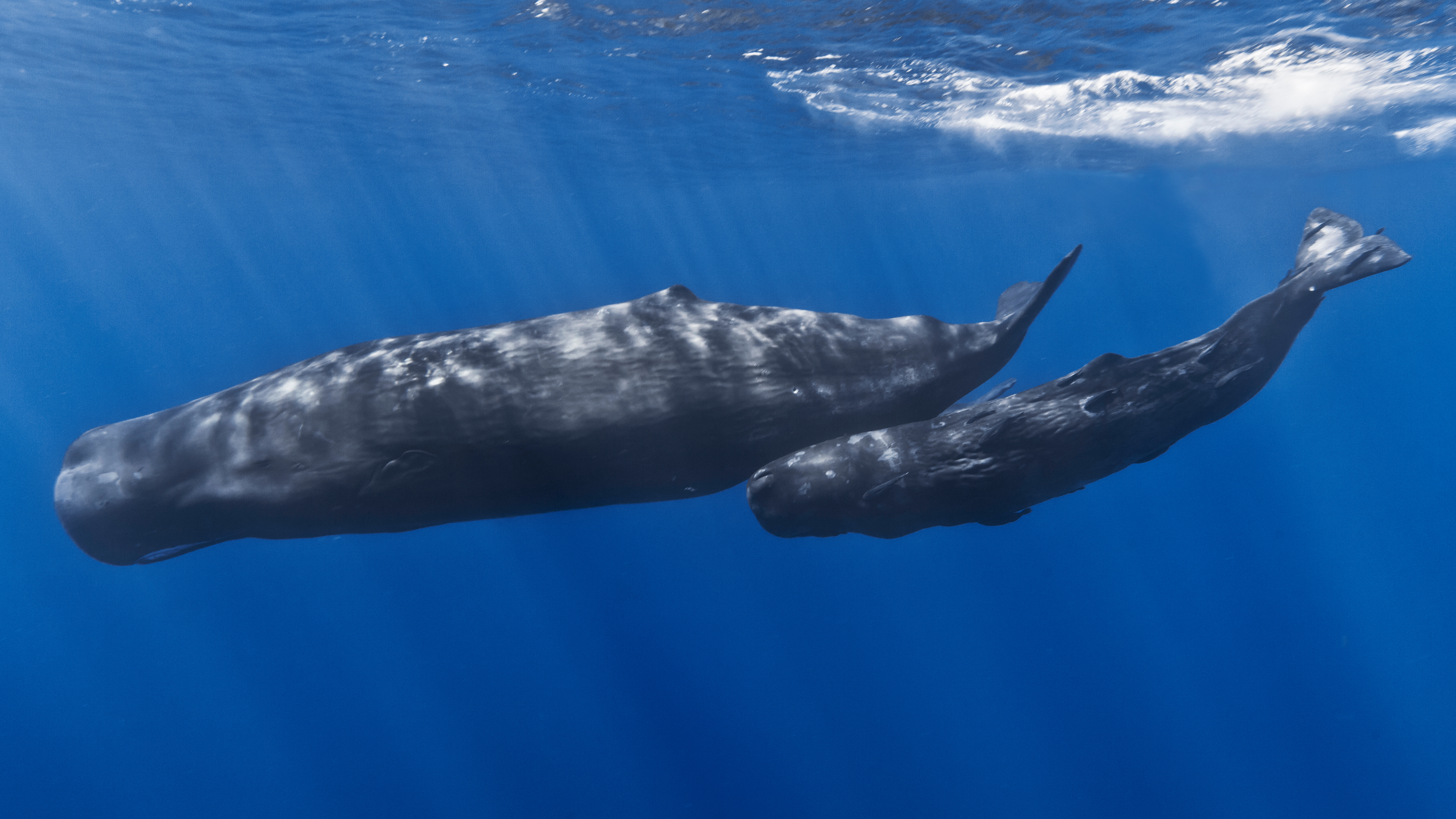
Sperm whale

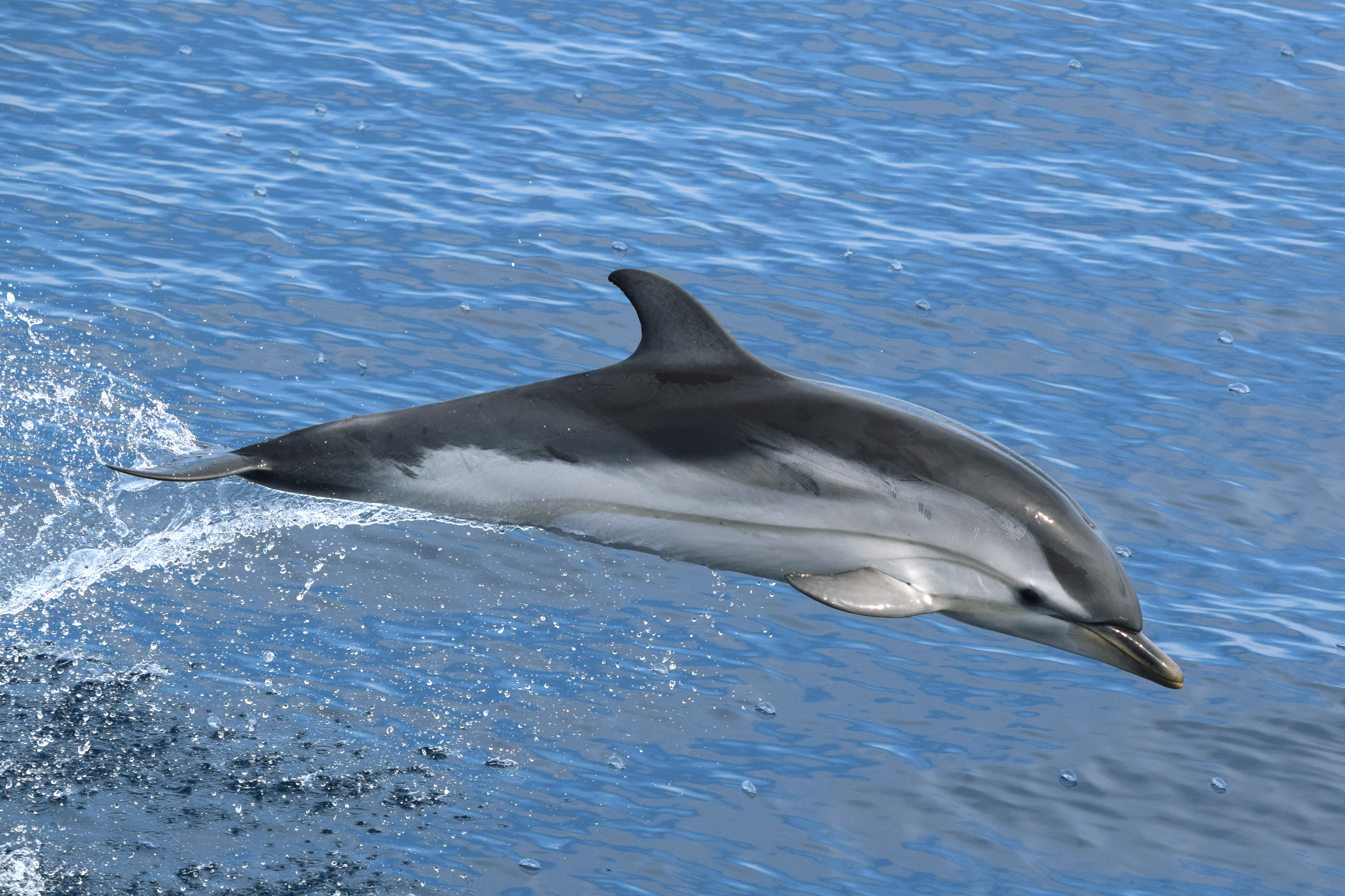
Striped dolphin

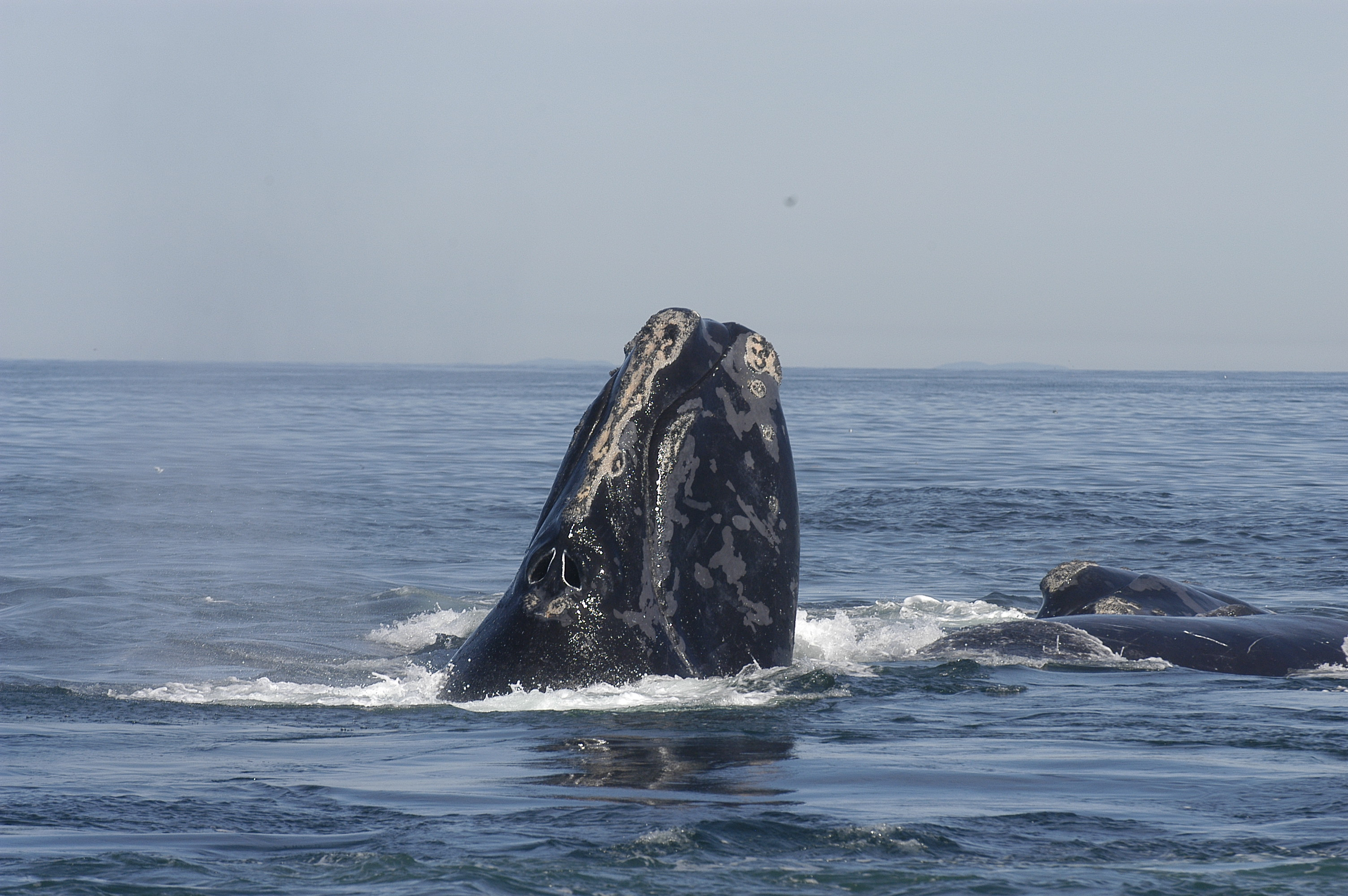
North Atlantic whale

The order Cetacea includes whales, dolphins and porpoises. They are the mammals most fully adapted to aquatic life with a spindle-shaped nearly hairless body, protected by a thick layer of blubber, and forelimbs and tail modified to provide propulsion underwater.

- Suborder: Mysticeti
  - Family: Balaenidae (right whales)
    - Genus: Eubalaena
      - North Atlantic right whale, E. glacialis CR vagrant
  - Family: Balaenopteridae (rorqual)
  - Subfamily: Megapterinae
    - Genus: Megaptera
      - Humpback whale, M. novaeangliae LC
    - Genus: Balaenoptera
      - Common minke whale, Balaenoptera acutorostrata LC
      - Fin whale, Balaenoptera physalus VU
- Suborder: Odontoceti
  - Superfamily: Platanistoidea
    - Family: Delphinidae (marine dolphins)
      - Genus: Steno
        - Rough-toothed dolphin, S. bredanensis LC
      - Genus: Delphinus
        - Short-beaked common dolphin, D. delphis LC
      - Genus: Orcinus
        - Orca, Orcinus orca DD
      - Genus: Pseudorca
        - False killer whale, Pseudorca crassidens DD
      - Genus: Globicephala
        - Long-finned pilot whale, Globicephala melas DD
      - Genus: Grampus
        - Risso's dolphin, Grampus griseus DD
      - Genus: Stenella
        - Striped dolphin, Stenella coeruleoalba DD
      - Genus Tursiops
        - Common bottlenose dolphin, Tursiops truncatus LC
    - Family Physeteridae (sperm whales)
      - Genus: Physeter
        - Sperm whale, Physeter macrocephalus VU
  - Superfamily Ziphioidea (beaked whales)
    - Family Ziphidae
      - Genus: Ziphius
        - Cuvier's beaked whale, Ziphius cavirostris LC

== Order: Carnivora (carnivorans) ==
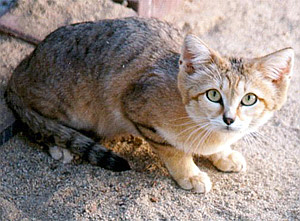
Sand cat

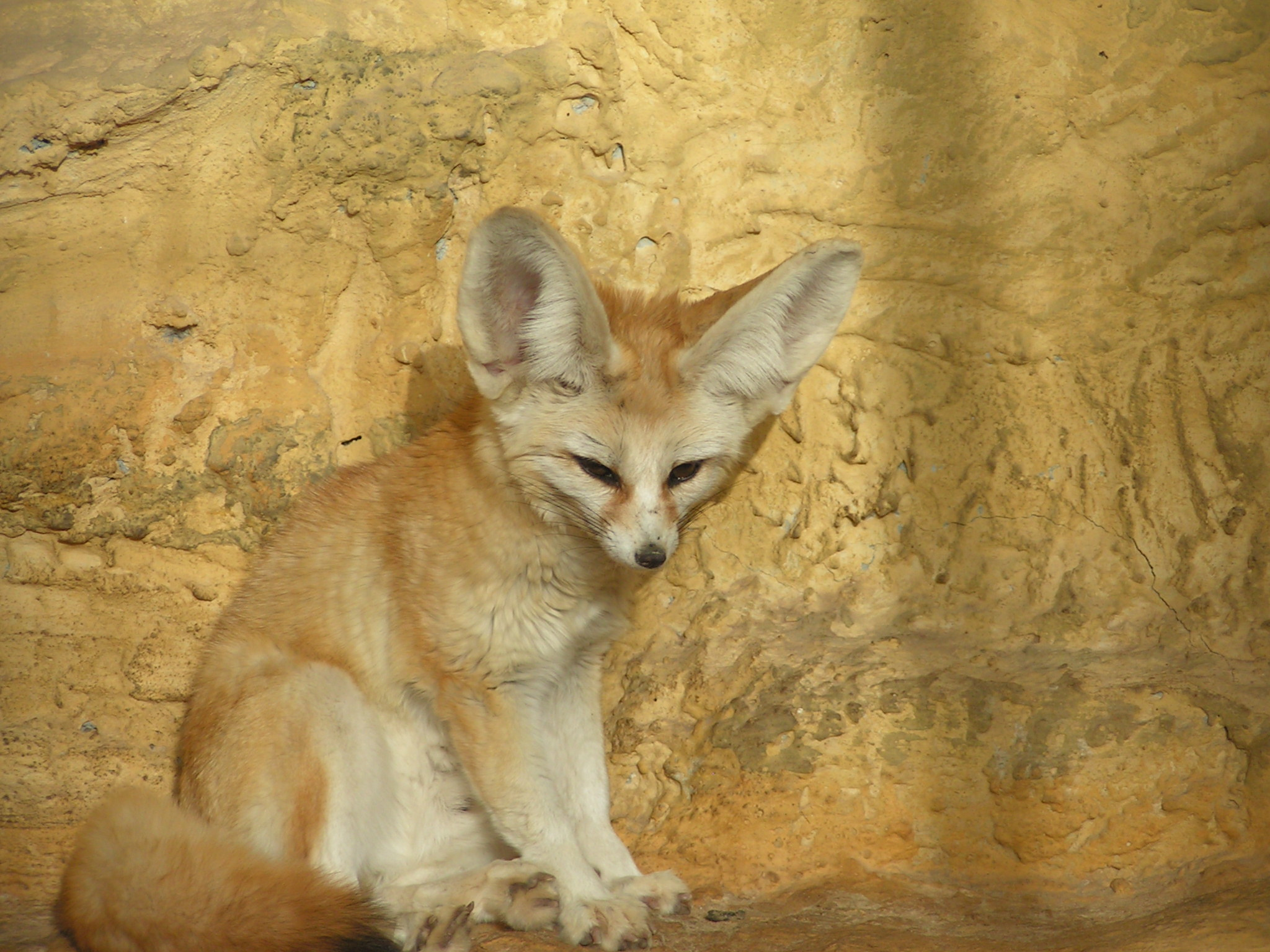
Fennec fox

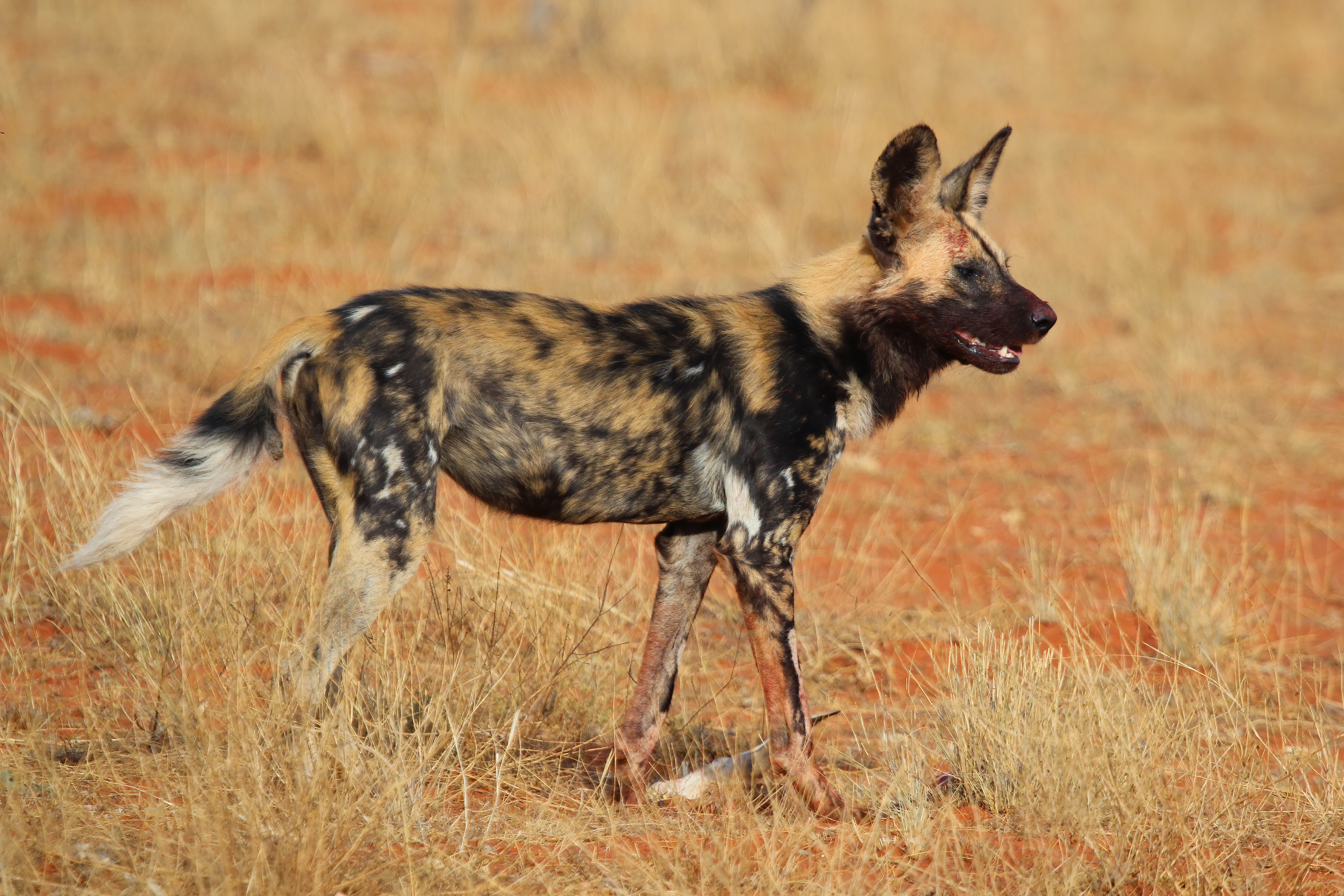
African wild dog

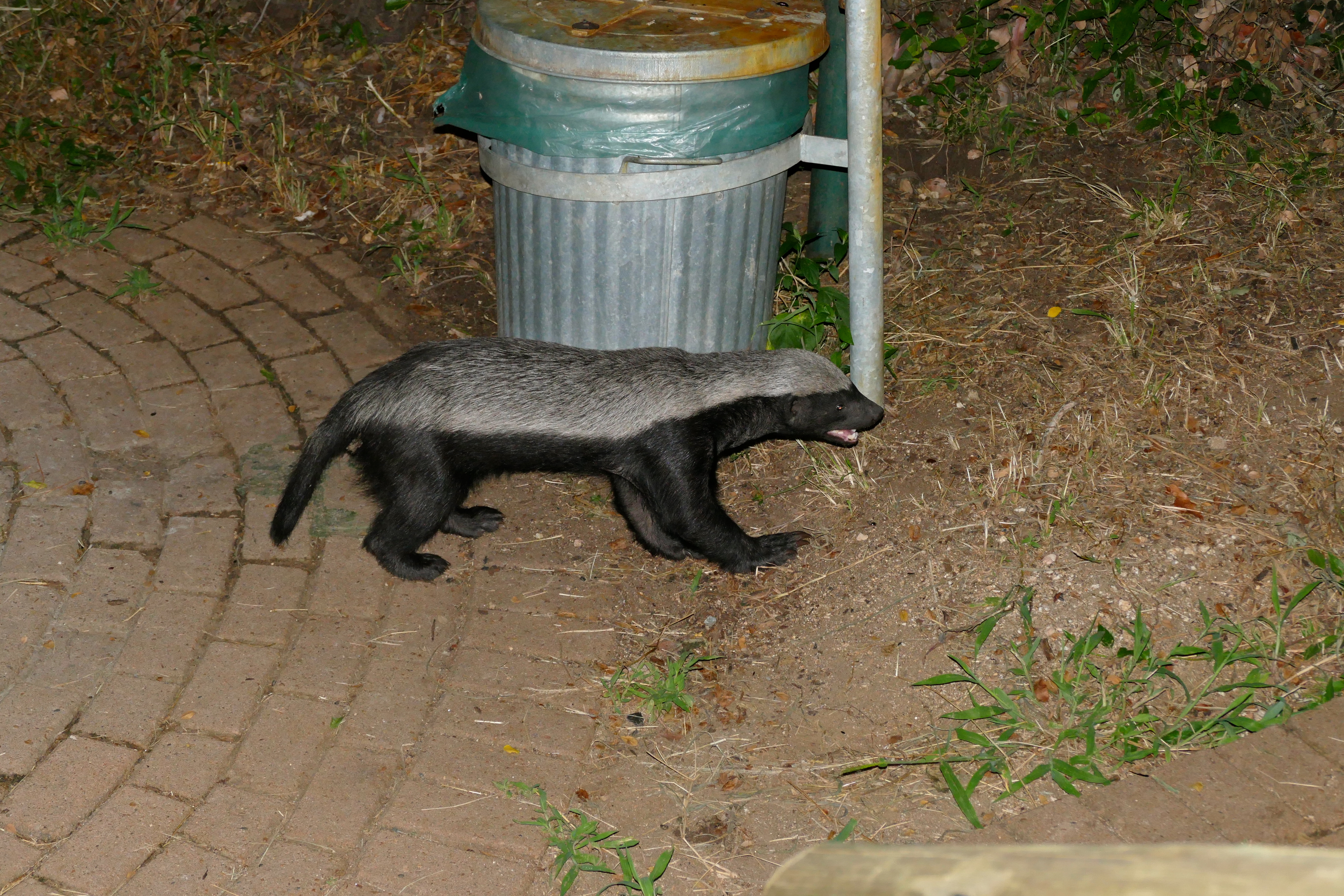
Honey badger

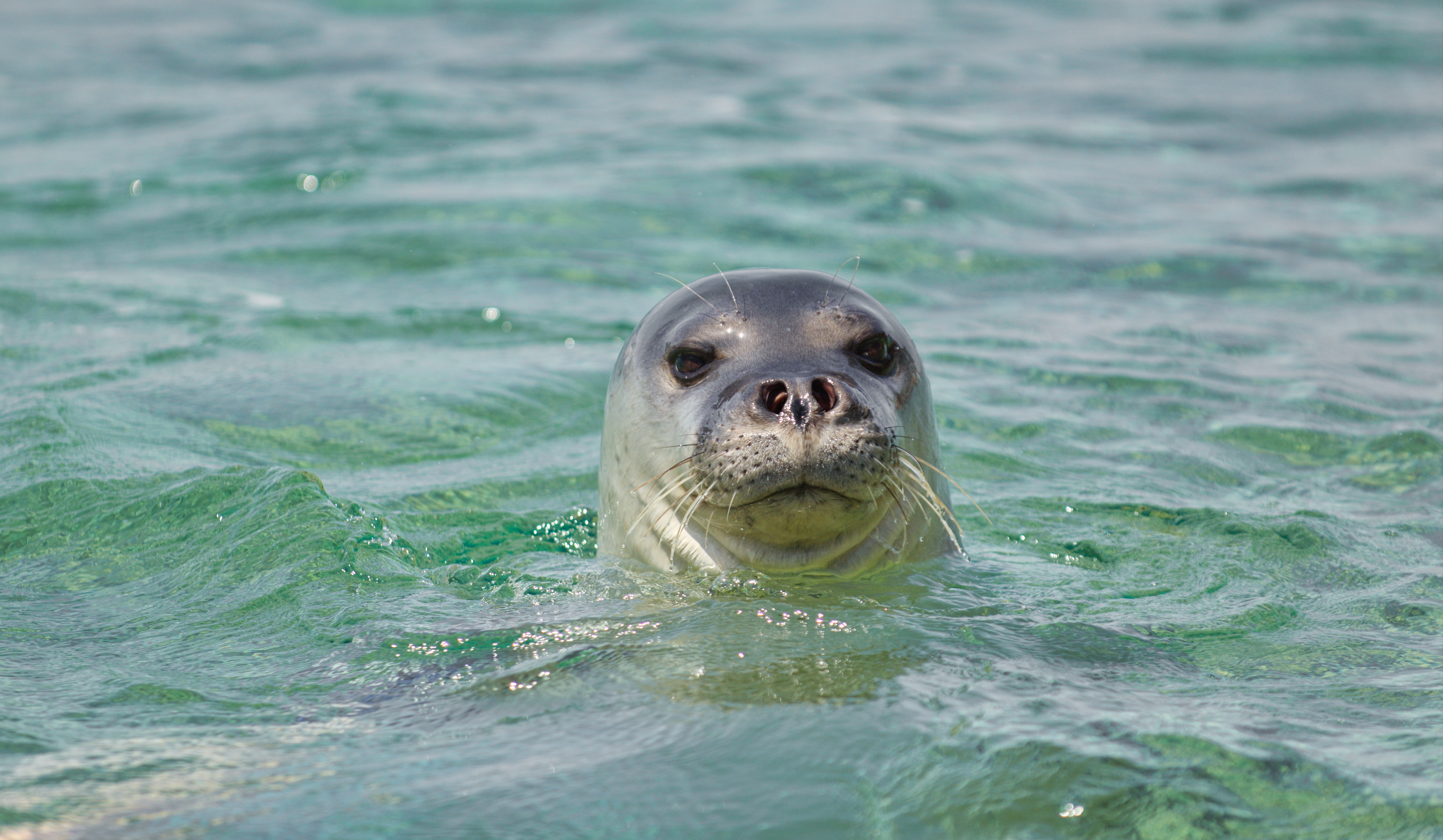
Mediterranean monk seal

There are over 260 species of carnivorans, the majority of which eat meat. They have a characteristic skull shape and dentition.

- Suborder: Feliformia
  - Family: Felidae (cats)
    - Subfamily: Felinae
      - Genus: Acinonyx
        - Cheetah, A. jubatus VU
          - Northwest African cheetah, A. j. hecki CR
      - Genus: Caracal
        - Caracal, C. caracal LC
      - Genus: Felis
        - African wildcat, F. lybica LC
        - Sand cat, F. margarita LC
      - Genus: Leptailurus
        - Serval, L. serval LC possibly extirpated
  - Family: Viverridae
    - Subfamily: Viverrinae
      - Genus: Genetta
        - Common genet, G. genetta LC
  - Family: Herpestidae (mongooses)
    - Genus: Herpestes
      - Egyptian mongoose, H. ichneumon LC
  - Family: Hyaenidae (hyaenas)
    - Genus: Crocuta
      - Spotted hyena, C. crocuta LC possibly extirpated
    - Genus: Hyaena
      - Striped hyena, H. hyaena LC
- Suborder: Caniformia
  - Family: Canidae (dogs, foxes)
    - Genus: Canis
      - African golden wolf, C. lupaster LC
    - Genus: Lycaon
      - African wild dog, L. pictus EN presence uncertain
    - Genus: Vulpes
      - Rüppell's fox, V. rueppelli LC
      - Red fox, V. vulpes LC
      - Fennec fox, V. zerda LC
  - Family: Mustelidae (mustelids)
    - Genus: Ictonyx
      - Saharan striped polecat, I. libyca LC
    - Genus: Lutra
      - European otter, L. lutra NT
    - Genus: Mellivora
      - Honey badger, M. capensis LC
    - Genus: Mustela
      - Least weasel, M. nivalis LC
  - Family: Phocidae (earless seals)
    - Genus: Monachus
      - Mediterranean monk seal, M. monachus VU presence uncertain

== Order: Artiodactyla (even-toed ungulates) ==
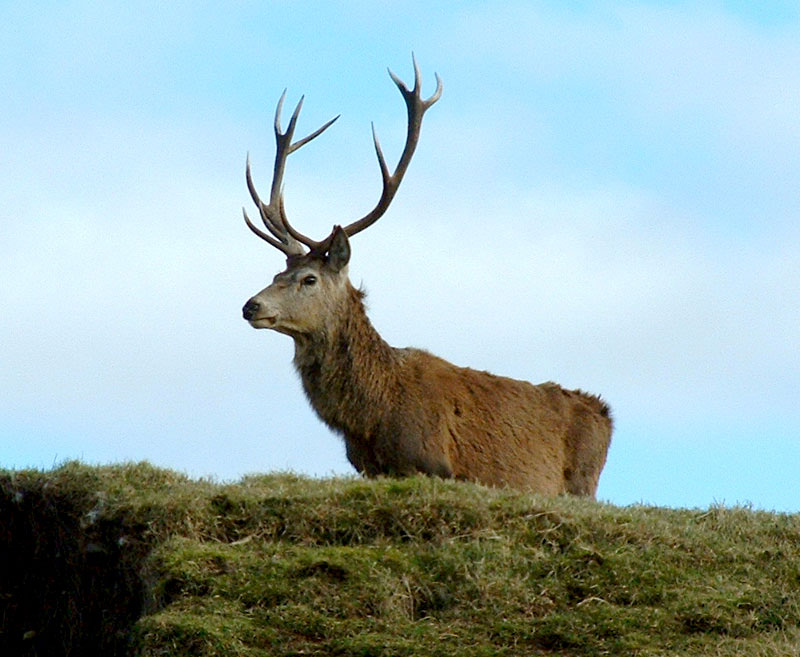
Red deer

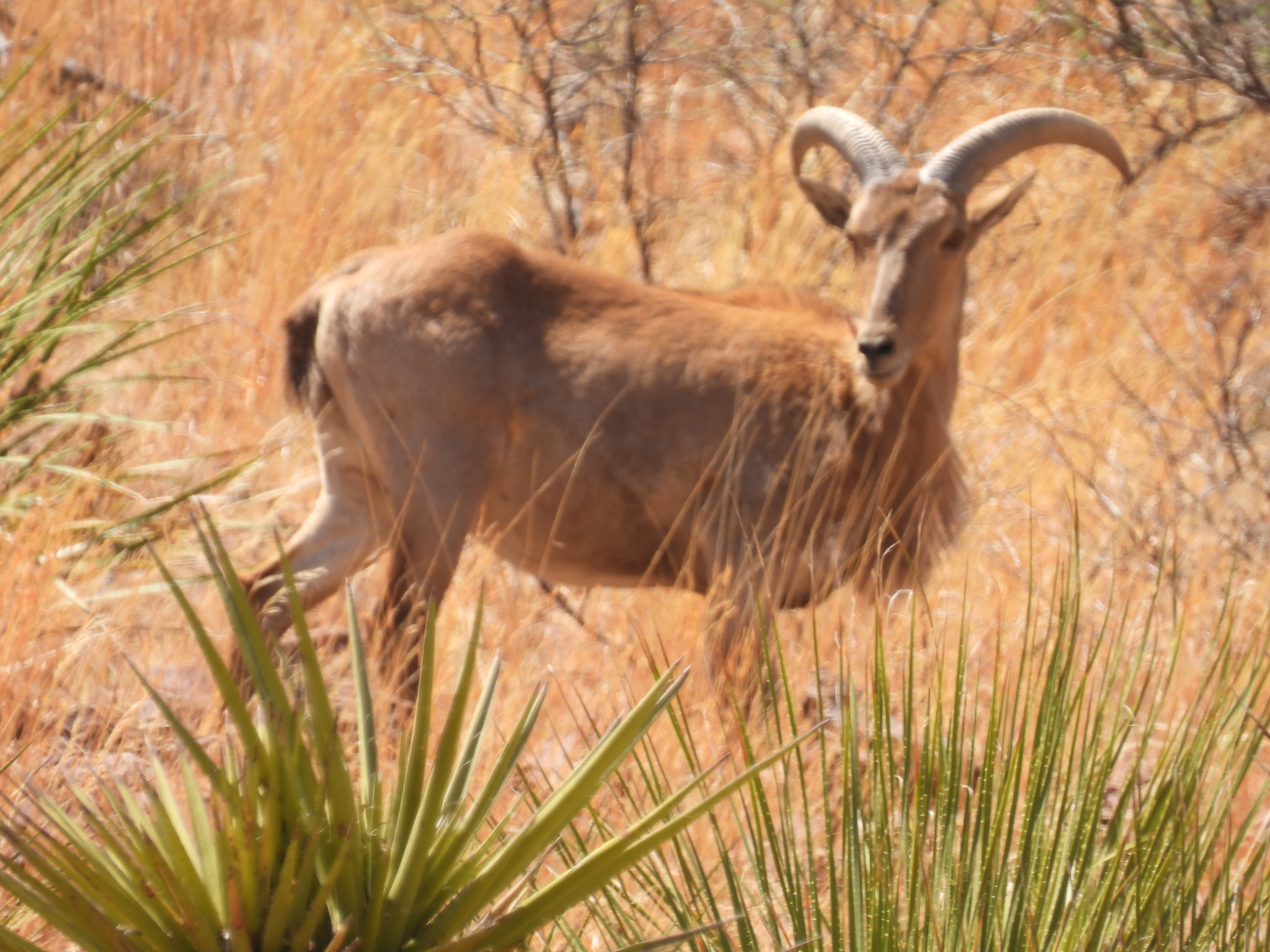
Barbary sheep

The even-toed ungulates are ungulates whose weight is borne about equally by the third and fourth toes, rather than mostly or entirely by the third as in perissodactyls. There are about 220 artiodactyl species, including many that are of great economic importance to humans.

- Family: Suidae (pigs)
  - Subfamily: Suinae
    - Genus: Sus
      - Wild boar, S. scrofa LC
- Family: Cervidae (deer)
  - Subfamily: Cervinae
    - Genus: Cervus
      - Red deer, C. elaphus LC
        - Barbary stag, C. e. barbarus
    - Genus: Dama
      - Fallow deer, D. dama LC introduced
- Family: Bovidae (cattle, antelope, sheep, goats)
  - Subfamily: Antilopinae
    - Genus: Gazella
      - Cuvier's gazelle, G. cuvieri VU
      - Dorcas gazelle, G. dorcas VU
      - Rhim gazelle, G. leptoceros EN
    - Genus: Nanger
      - Dama gazelle, N. dama CR possibly extirpated
  - Subfamily: Caprinae
    - Genus: Ammotragus
      - Barbary sheep, A. lervia VU

== Globally and locally extinct ==
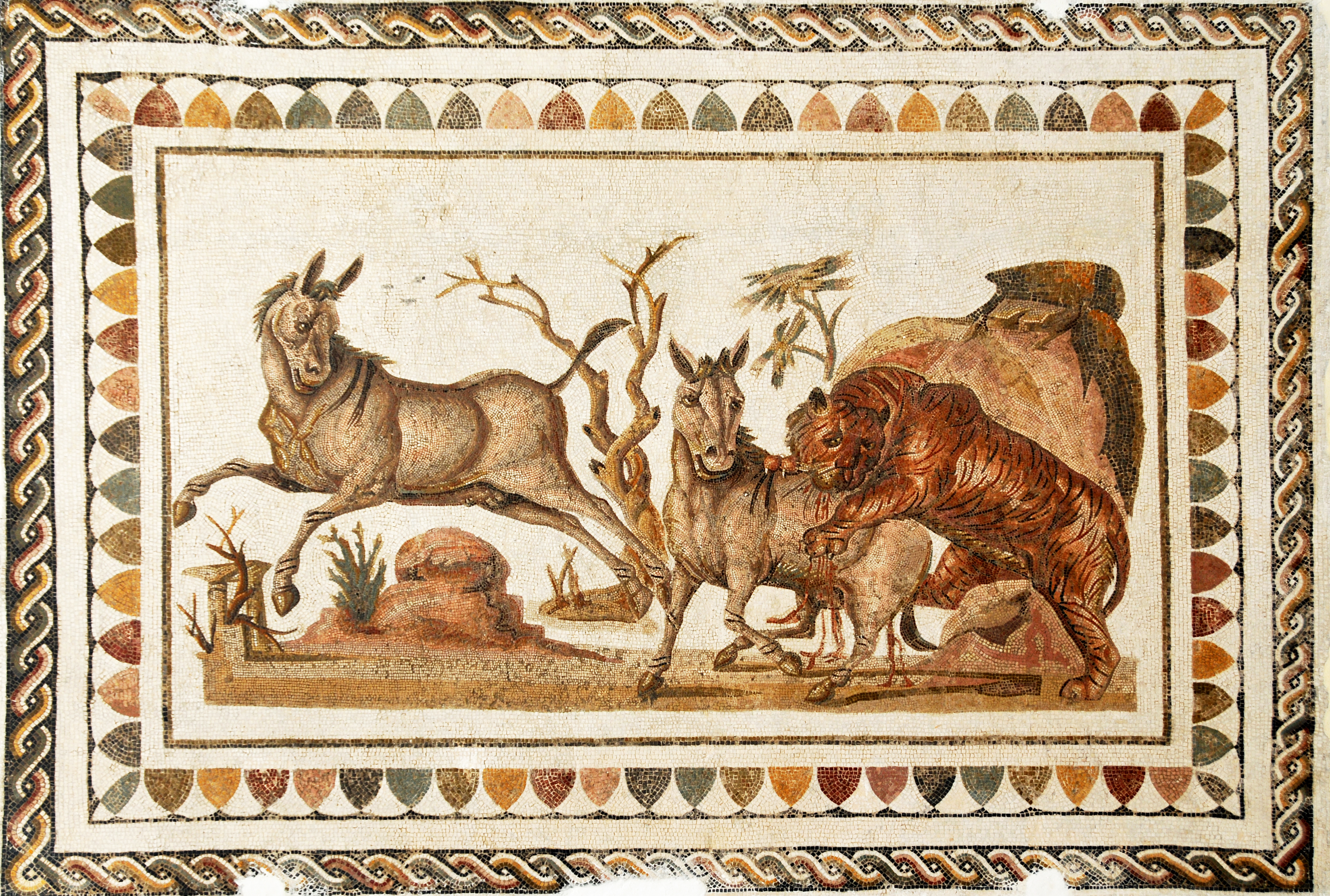
Roman mosaic of Atlas wild asses and a tiger, ca. 300 AD, Tunisia

The following species are globally extinct:

- Atlas bear, Ursus arctos crowtheri EX (1870)
- Barbary leopard, Panthera pardus pardus EX (1996)
- Atlas wild ass, Equus africanus atlanticus EX (c. 300 AD)
- Bubal hartebeest, Alcelaphus buselaphus buselaphus EX (1925)
- North African elephant, Loxodonta africana pharaohensis EX (c. 400 AD)
- Red gazelle, Eudorcas rufina DD (Note: IUCN evaluates the subspecies as Data Deficient due to uncertainty of taxonomy and no reports of being in the wild) (Late 1800s)

The following species are locally extinct in Algeria, but continue to live elsewhere or in captivity:

- Addax, Addax nasomaculatus CR
- Barbary lion, Panthera leo leo EW
- Hippopotamus, Hippopotamus amphibius VU
- Scimitar oryx, Oryx dammah EN

== See also ==
- List of chordate orders
- Lists of mammals by region
- Mammal classification
