= Coleophora plurifoliella =

Scientific classification
- Kingdom: Animalia
- Phylum: Arthropoda
- Class: Insecta
- Order: Lepidoptera
- Family: Coleophoridae
- Genus: Coleophora
- Species: C. plurifoliella

Binomial name
- Coleophora plurifoliella Chrétien, 1896

Species of moth

Coleophora plurifoliella is a moth of the family Coleophoridae. It is found in Algeria, Tunisia and the Palestinian Territories.

The larvae feed on Atriplex halimus. They feed on the leaves of their host plant.
