= Coleophora crassicornella =

Scientific classification
- Kingdom: Animalia
- Phylum: Arthropoda
- Class: Insecta
- Order: Lepidoptera
- Family: Coleophoridae
- Genus: Coleophora
- Species: C. crassicornella

Binomial name
- Coleophora crassicornella Chrétien, 1915

Synonyms
- Coleophora sabuletella Toll, 1956

Species of moth

Coleophora crassicornella is a moth of the family Coleophoridae that is endemic to Algeria.

The larvae feed on Atriplex halimus. They feed on the leaves of their host plant.
