= Thin sand rat =

Conservation status
- Data Deficient (IUCN 3.1)

Scientific classification
- Kingdom: Animalia
- Phylum: Chordata
- Class: Mammalia
- Order: Rodentia
- Family: Muridae
- Genus: Psammomys
- Species: P. vexillaris

Binomial name
- Psammomys vexillaris Thomas, 1925

Species of mammal belonging to the gerbil subfamily of rodents

The thin sand rat or lesser sand rat (Psammomys vexillaris) is a species of rodent in the family Muridae. It has also been previously named the pale sand rat based on work published by Oldfield Thomas in 1925. It is found in Algeria, Libya, and Tunisia, and its natural habitats are subtropical or tropical dry shrubland and intermittent salt lakes. The thin sand rat was previously classified as a subspecies of the fat sand rat. However, morphological differences in size and coat color between the two animals, along with recent molecular evidence suggest that they are different species. The thin sand rat may be a natural reservoir for the disease leishmaniasis.
