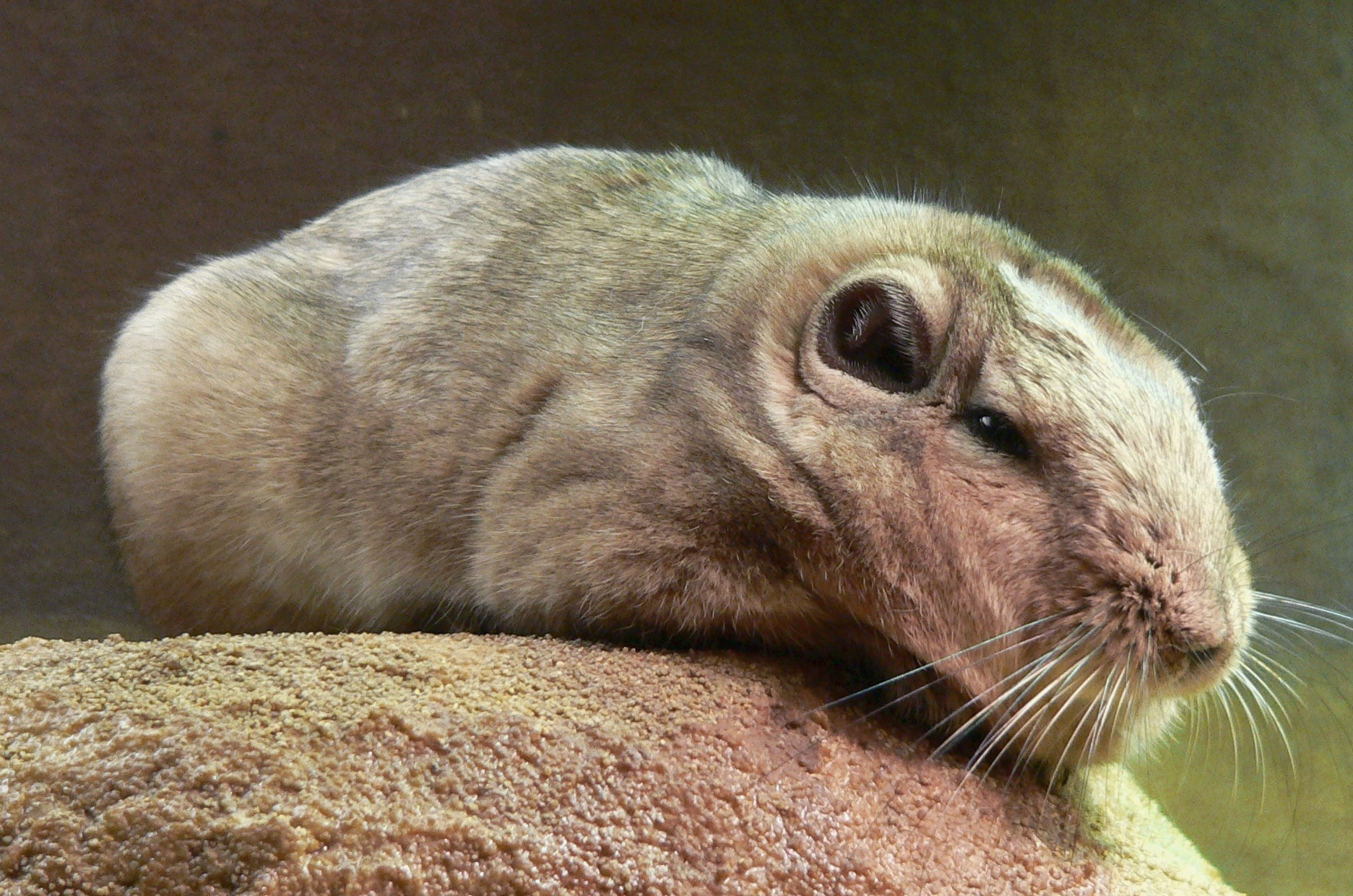

Conservation status
- Least Concern (IUCN 3.1)

Scientific classification
- Kingdom: Animalia
- Phylum: Chordata
- Class: Mammalia
- Order: Rodentia
- Family: Ctenodactylidae
- Genus: Ctenodactylus
- Species: C. gundi

Binomial name
- Ctenodactylus gundi (Rothmann, 1776)
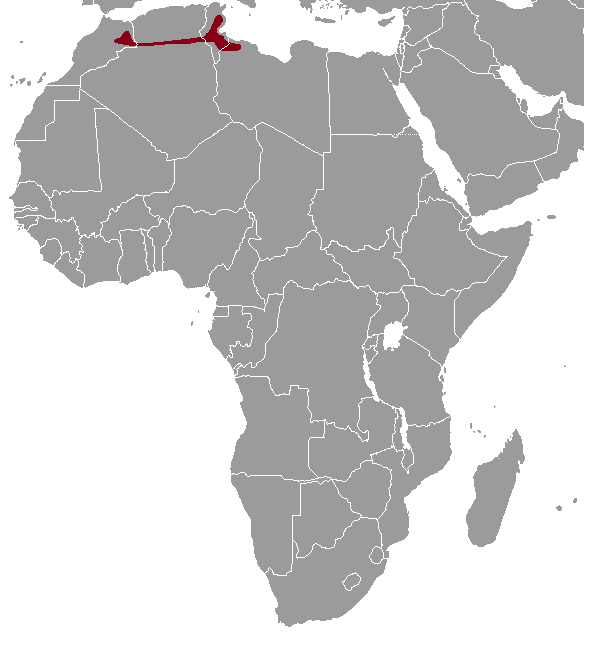
- distribution

Synonyms
- C. arabicus (Shaw, 1801); C. massonii Gray, 1830; C. typicus A. Smith, 1834

= Common gundi =

Species of rodent

The common gundi (Ctenodactylus gundi) is a species of rodent in the family Ctenodactylidae. It is found in Algeria, Libya, Morocco, and Tunisia. The parasitic organism Toxoplasma gondii was first described in 1908 in Tunis by Charles Nicolle and Louis Manceaux within the tissues of the gundi and named after it.

== Description ==
The common gundi grows to a length of between 16 and 20 cm (6.3 and 7.9 in), having a stumpy tail of 10 to 20 mm (0.4 to 0.8 in). A gundi weighs about 185 g (6.5 oz). It resembles a guinea pig in appearance, having big eyes, flat ears and short limbs. Each foot has four digits and sharp, dark claws; the two hind feet have comblike bristles between the claws. Gundi's teeth are rootless.

== Distribution ==
This gundi is found in northern Africa on the south side of the Atlas Mountains at altitudes up to about 2,900 m (9,500 ft). Its range extends from western Libya through Tunisia and Algeria to eastern Morocco.

== Ecology and biology ==
Gundis are diurnal and herbivorous. It lives in rocky, arid places, making its home in crevices and under boulders. These homes are usually temporary.

In the early morning, gundis sunbathe until the temperature passes 20°C (68°F). Once it's hot enough, the gundis will forage and eat, then go back to sunbathing on warm rocks. They will shelter in the shade once the temperature reaches 32°C (90°F). Only after the temperature drops again, in the afternoon, do gundis leave their shelter. It forages for leaves, stems, flowers and seeds over large distances because of the scarcity of suitable plants. It does not drink, obtaining sufficient water from its diet, nor does it store food as do some desert rodents.

Gundis make chirp-like sounds to communicate with each other. If alarmed, they thump their hind feet as well.

A gundi reaches sexual maturity at the age of nine to twelve months. The gestation period is estimated to be 57 days and the litter size averages just under two. Gundis are born with open eyes and fur. They are able to control their body temperature from birth, and are weaned after only four weeks. The interval between litters is about 70 days.

The gundi is a territorial species, with family groups of between three and eleven adults defending a territory. Gundis live in colonies, and within these colonies, gundis live in separate units. A unit can be a female, male, and their offspring, or multiple females with juveniles. Gundis sleep in piles to stay warm during the winter.

Of the common gundis tested in southeastern Tunisia, nearly half were found to harbour Leishmania parasites; Leishmania tropica was found in five individuals and Leishmania major in one. These protozoan parasites are causative agents of cutaneous leishmaniasis, a skin disease transmitted by female sandflies, and it is thought that the gundi may act as a natural reservoir for the pathogen.

== Status ==
The common gundi is a fairly common species with a wide range, and no particular threats have been identified. Its abundance varies according to the amount of precipitation that falls; in the west of its range it is replaced by Val's gundi (Ctenodactylus vali) in dry years. The International Union for Conservation of Nature has assessed it as being a species of "least concern".
