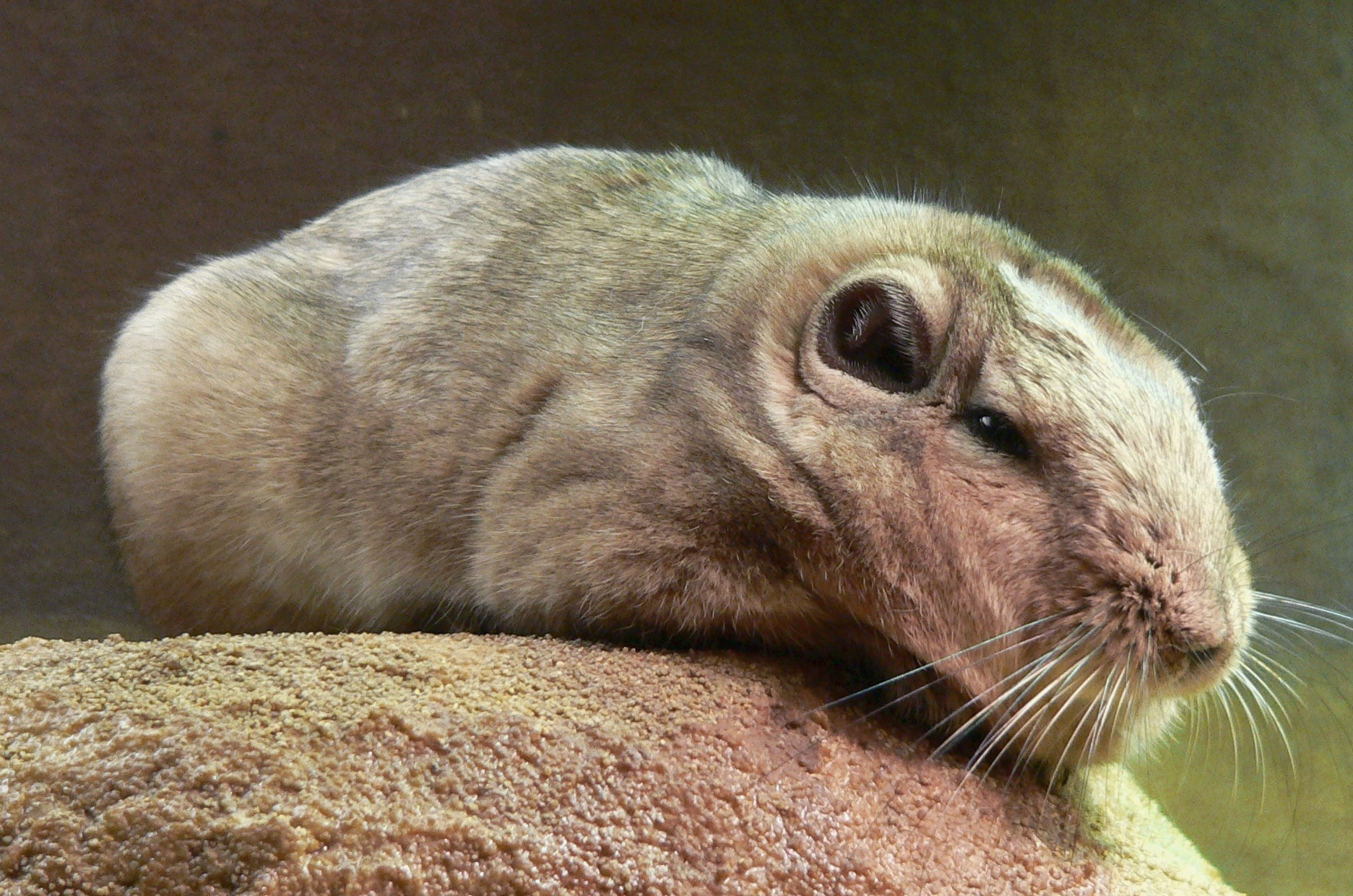
- Ctenodactylus gundi

Scientific classification
- Kingdom: Animalia
- Phylum: Chordata
- Class: Mammalia
- Order: Rodentia
- Family: Ctenodactylidae
- Genus: Ctenodactylus; J. E. Gray, 1830

Type species
- Ctenodactylus massonii J. E. Gray, 1830 (= Mus gundi Rothmann, 1776)
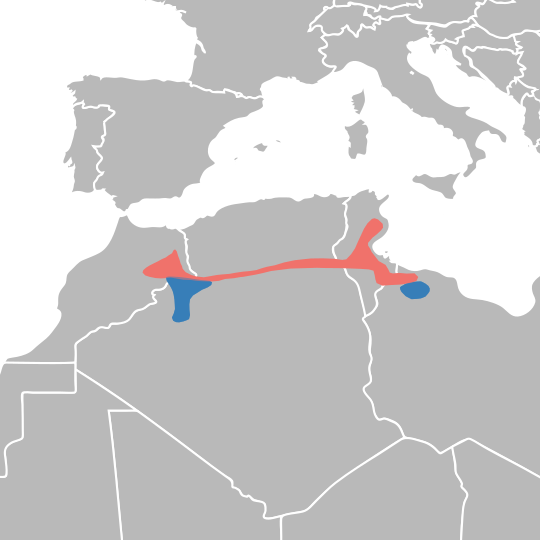
- Ctenodactylus distribution C. gundi in red, C. vali in blue

= Ctenodactylus =

Genus of rodents

Ctenodactylus, from Ancient Greek κτείς (kteís), meaning "comb", and δάκτυλος (dáktulos), meaning "finger", is a genus of rodents in the family Ctenodactylidae (comb rats or gundis). It contains the following two species:

- Ctenodactylus gundi (Rothmann, 1776)
- Ctenodactylus vali Thomas, 1902
