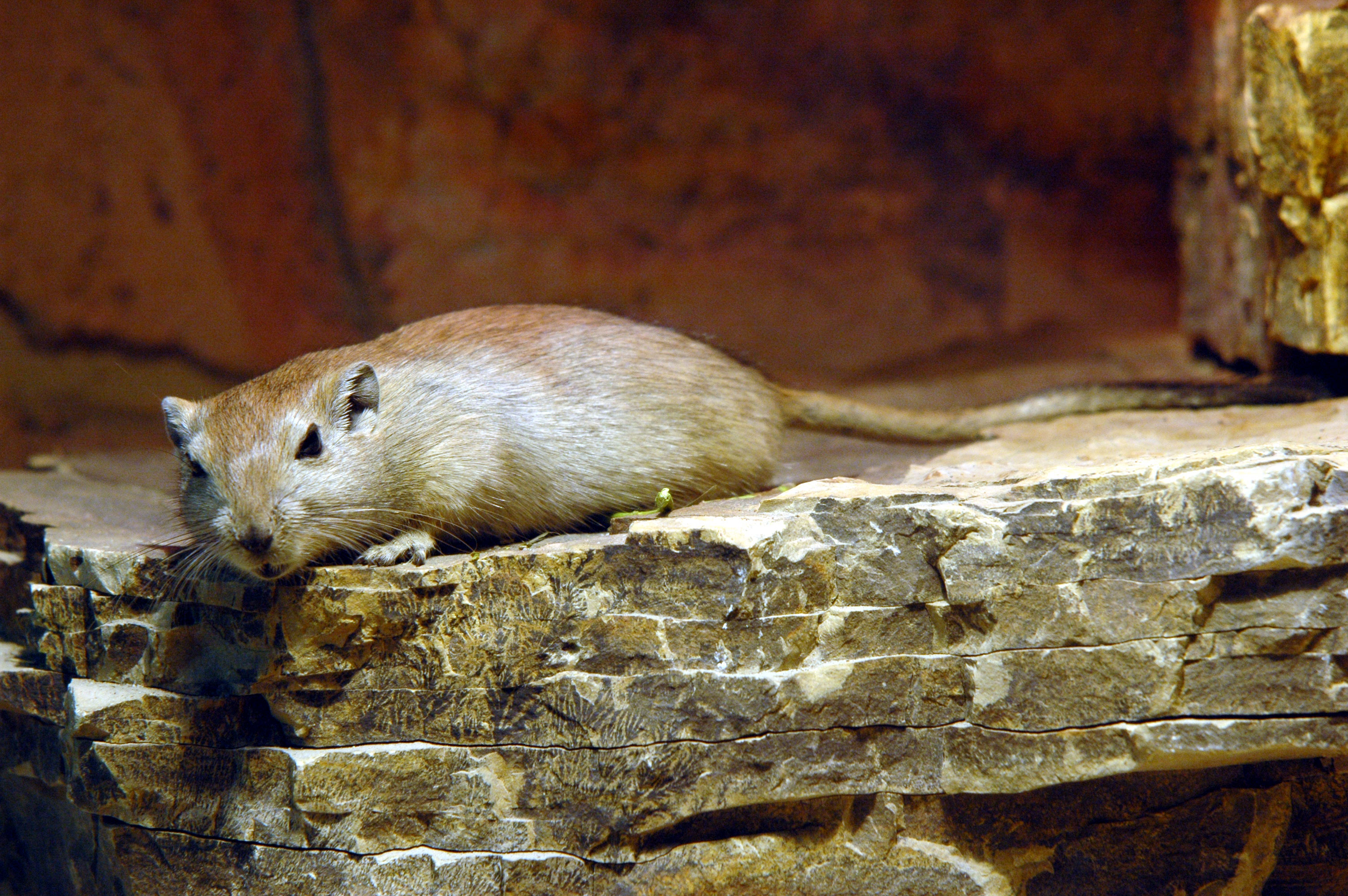
- Fat sand rat (Psammomys obesus)

Scientific classification
- Kingdom: Animalia
- Phylum: Chordata
- Class: Mammalia
- Order: Rodentia
- Family: Muridae
- Subtribe: Rhombomyina
- Genus: Psammomys; Cretzschmar, 1828

Type species
- Psammomys obesus

Species
- Psammomys obesus; Psammomys vexillaris

= Psammomys =

Psammomys Temporal range: Late Pleistocene – Recent

Genus of rodents

Psammomys is a genus of rodents in the family Muridae. The two species in the genus are the fat sand rat (Psammomys obesus) and the thin sand rat (Psammomys vexillaris).

The etymology of the genus name derives from the two Ancient Greek words ψάμμος (psámmos), meaning "sand", and μῦς (mûs), meaning "mouse, rat". The complete nuclear DNA genome of one Psamomys species, P. obesus, has been sequenced in 2017.
