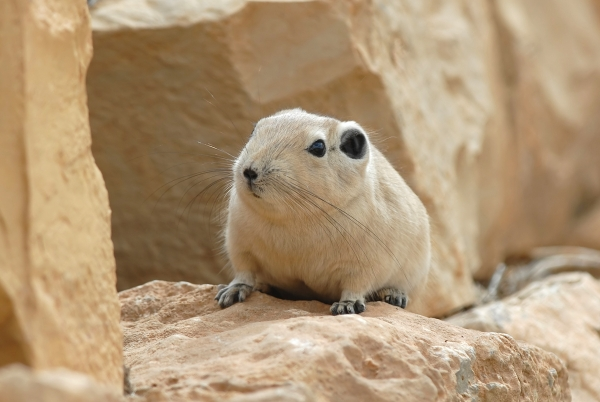

Conservation status
- Data Deficient (IUCN 3.1)

Scientific classification
- Kingdom: Animalia
- Phylum: Chordata
- Class: Mammalia
- Order: Rodentia
- Family: Ctenodactylidae
- Genus: Ctenodactylus
- Species: C. vali

Binomial name
- Ctenodactylus vali Thomas, 1902
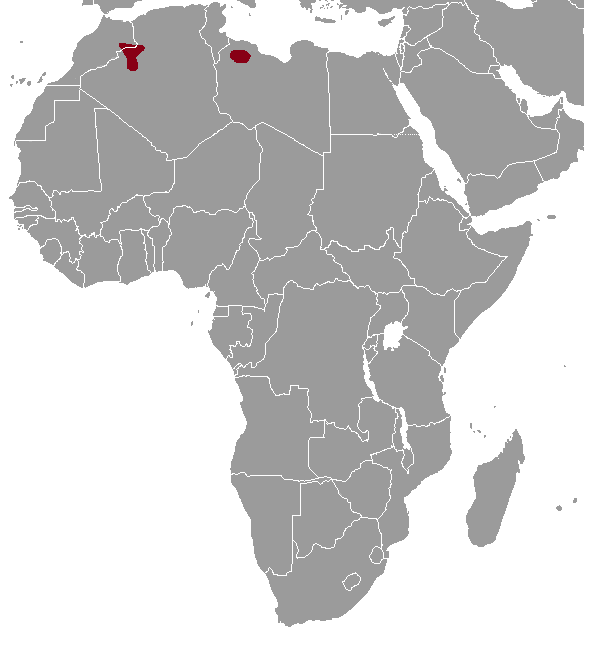
- distribution

= Val's gundi =

Species of rodent

Val's gundi (Ctenodactylus vali) is a species of rodent in the family Ctenodactylidae. It is known from two widely separated areas of North Africa.

== Description ==
Val's gundi is very similar to the other species of gundi, especially the common gundi, with grey, soft, silky fur and a resemblance to guinea pigs. They have rounded ears; round eyes; stocky, blunt nosed bodies; short legs; short necks; and short, furry tails.

== Distribution ==
Val's gundi is found in two isolated populations. The western population occurs in northeastern Morocco but with the main part of the population in adjacent parts of northwestern Algeria, in the Oued Guir, Oued Zouzfana and Oued Saoura, with the most southernly record from Kerzaz in Algeria. The eastern population is in northwestern Libya, some 1,000 km (620 mi) from the other population and is found on high plateaus at about 1,000 m (3,300 ft) in altitude.

== Biology ==
Val's gundi is found in rocky habitats, using fissures and rocky crevices as shelters. Compared to the common gundi it inhabits drier desert regions and is less sociable and much more solitary. The males and females only come together in the breeding season which lasts from November to January. It is generally diurnal, but it is occasionally active for short periods after sunset. The gestation period of 56 days after which a litter of one to three young are born, the female gives birth to two or three litters per year. The previous litters are independent prior to the birth of the next litter.

Val's gundi is thought to be limited to rockier and drier habitat as a result of competition with the common gundi.

== Taxonomy and name ==
Val's gundi was considered to be a subspecies of common gundi, but studies have shown that it is morphologically and behaviourally distinctive. The derivation of the name is from a local word for the rodent rather than after a person, "vali" may be a local word for this rodent, as is "gundi" elsewhere.

== Conservation status ==
Val's gundi is currently listed as Data Deficient since there is no substantial information on the species range or population numbers or abundance, making it difficult to ascertain what the true status of the species is. It is thought that as there are no likely threats to the species its true status may be Least Concern.
