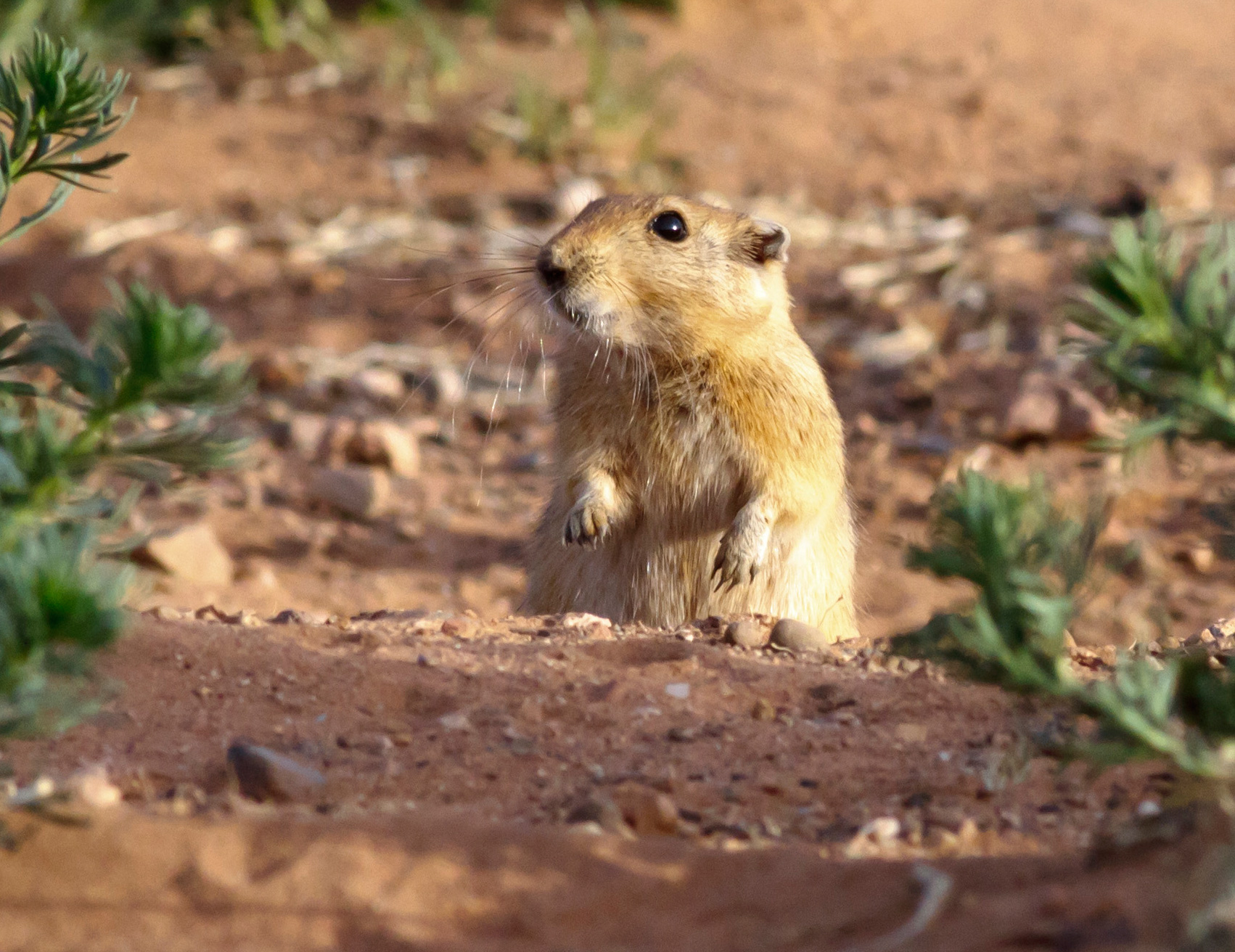
- A fat sand rat in Morocco

Conservation status
- Least Concern (IUCN 3.1)

Scientific classification
- Kingdom: Animalia
- Phylum: Chordata
- Class: Mammalia
- Order: Rodentia
- Family: Muridae
- Genus: Psammomys
- Species: P. obesus

Binomial name
- Psammomys obesus Cretzschmar, 1828

= Fat sand rat =

Fat sand rat Temporal range: Late Miocene–Recent

Species of rodent

The fat sand rat (Psammomys obesus) is a terrestrial mammal from the gerbil subfamily that is mostly found in North Africa and the Middle East, ranging from Mauritania to the Arabian Peninsula. This species usually lives in sandy deserts, but may also be found in rocky terrain or saline marsh areas. Fat sand rats are very selective in their diet, only eating stems and leaves of plants from the family Amaranthaceae, more commonly known as the amaranth family. In captivity, fat sand rats can become obese and rapidly develop diabetes-like symptoms when fed the diet typically given to other rodents. P. obesus has an average lifespan of 14 months in the wild and 3–4 years in captivity.

== Ecology ==
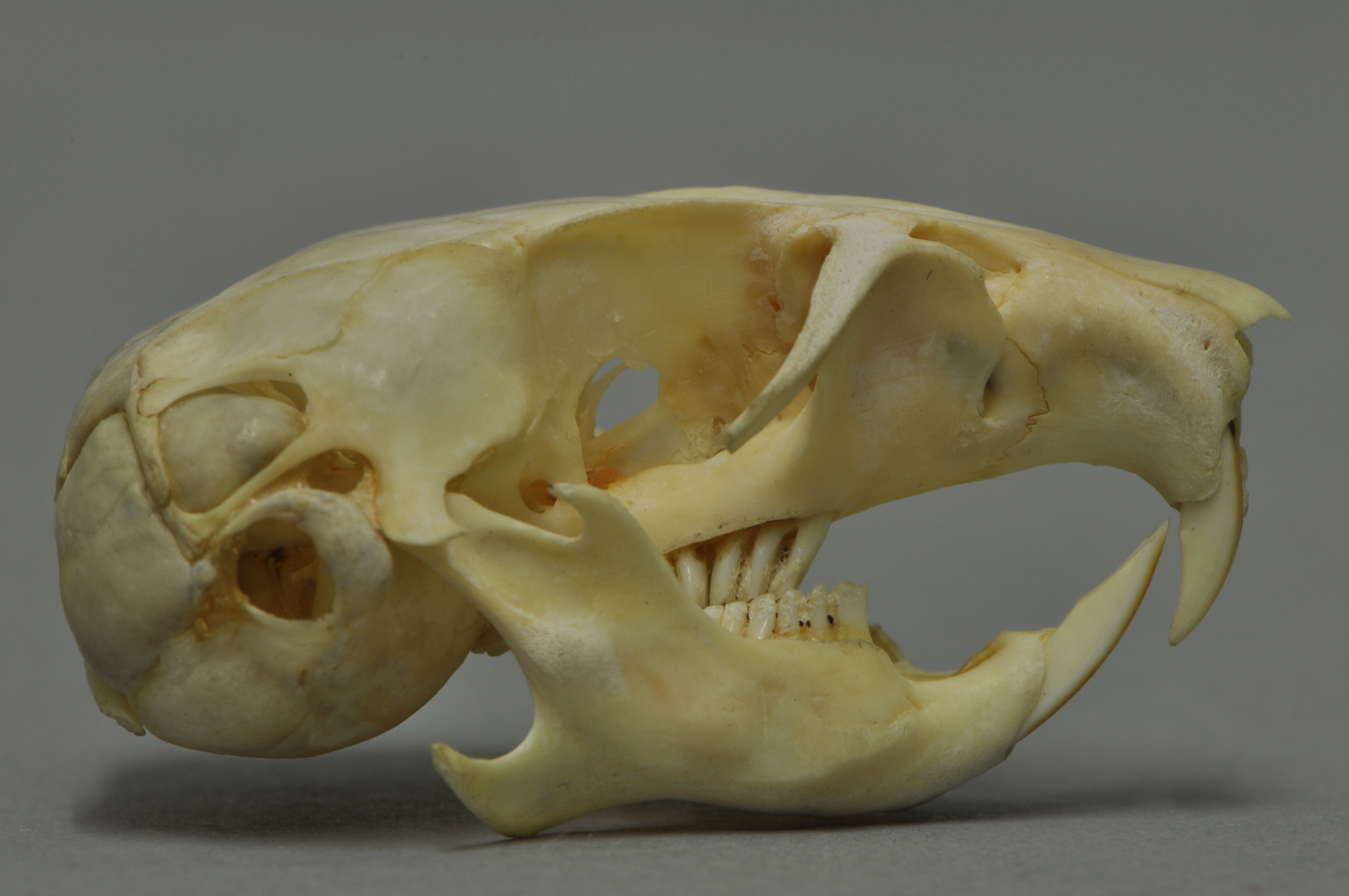
Skull of a fat sand rat

=== Activity patterns ===
The fat sand rat is diurnal, but its activity on the surface fluctuates depending on the ambient temperature. Its period of activity is shortest in the summer, starting in the early morning and finishing an hour to several hours after. As the year progresses and the temperature becomes colder, the fat sand rat is active for a longer amount of time during the day, and the time at which daily activity is initiated is delayed. Upon emerging from their burrows, individuals spend a part of the beginning of their day sunbathing, engaging in other activities such as foraging afterwards.

Individuals with greater body masses have been found to forage for longer periods of time than those with a smaller body mass. When foraging, a fat sand rat will cut pieces away from plants and bring them back to their burrows, where they either eat the plant in the burrow or around the entrance, or store the plant for later consumption, which is called hoarding. The most common way that fat sand rats acquire water in the desert environment is by ingesting plants such as Atriplex halimus, which are high in water content and provide the rodent with preformed water when they are consumed. As a result of this strategy, fat sand rats do not need to drink free-standing water.

Aside from foraging, the fat sand rat also spends time outside the burrow exploring. It is atypical in its exploratory behaviour since when it encounters a novel environment it exhibits perimeter patrolling behaviours, moving in straight lines along the border of an environment, rather than engaging in looping or home base behaviours usually displayed by rodents. Males also spend more time exploring an area than females.

=== Sociality ===
Fat sand rats are not social animals. They live in separate burrows, with males occupying larger ranges of space than females. Typically, members of the same sex actively avoid interacting, but when females do encounter each other, they engage in aggressive behaviours, and will attack each other. Males can interact in an aggressive manner towards each other, pushing or displaying sideways postures, but the majority of their interactions are peaceful. Members of opposite sexes usually only interact with each other for copulation. Aside from copulation, the type of interaction that results between males and females differs depending on which individual approaches the other. When males approach females, the fat sand rats tend to interact in an agonistic manner, and display many different behaviours, some of which include sidling, displaying sideways postures, pushing, upright boxing, and attacking each other. When females initiate the interactions and approach a male, agonistic encounters also occur as with male initiated interactions, but peaceful interactions where animals will sniff, investigate, follow, and groom each other are much more common.

=== Habitat selection ===
Fat sand rats dig burrows with multiple entrances directly under plants they consume, primarily selecting burrowing sites based on the abundance of Amaranthaceae shrubs in the area over any other factor such as cover. As such, their preferred type of habitat, and the distribution of fat sand rats in a particular habitat changes throughout the year in response to the different growing season of plants in the wadi beds or terraces that they inhabit. Wadi beds are typically populated with Amaranthaceae shrubs, and have dense vegetative cover, while terraces are very sparsely vegetated, leaving the habitat exposed. Distribution of the fat sand rat in a particular habitat is also influenced by the abundance of rainfall in the area, as well as the population density of the site from the previous season. During the winter, fat sand rats prefer the wadi habitat as a result of the vegetative growth during this time, but after a wet autumn, more individuals will burrow in a terrace habitat even when population density is low, as opposed to after a dry autumn, when individuals only burrow in terrace habitats when the population density is high.

The burrowing activities of the rodents can impact their habitat, affecting the bacteria in the soil around their burrows such that nitrogen fixation and denitrification activity are decreased. The fat sand rat also disturbs vegetation cover while burrowing, further altering its environment. Mounds of active burrows have significantly less percent cover from vegetation than abandoned burrows and undisturbed land near abandoned burrows.

=== Anti-predator behaviour ===
Fat sand rats are preyed upon by many desert species, including several kinds of avian predators, snakes, desert cats, and members of the family Mustelidae. Depending on the type of habitat they have burrowed in, they are exposed to different risks concerning predation. In response to the threat of predation, they employ anti-predator vigilance behaviour when above ground, and will stop what they are doing to take an upright posture and survey the area or look intently in one direction. In addition to this posture, the rodents will thump their foot loudly and squeak before retreating into their burrow when frightened. There appears to be no reaction from other nearby individuals in response to this behaviour, so there may be no benefit in terms of warning conspecifics of predators in performing the foot thumping.

Fat sand rats in the terrace habitat spend significantly more time engaging in this vigilance behaviour when they are above ground than individuals living in the wadi beds, but the behaviour is not costly in that it does not interrupt their foraging, as both groups spend equivalent amounts of time foraging. However, there is a difference in foraging behaviour between the two groups, as fat sand rats living in terraces tend to hoard their food more often than those living in wadi beds, and take less time to eat as well. The sociality of the fat sand rat may also have an impact on their antipredator behaviours, as they have been shown to spend less time foraging and feeding, and initiate vigilance behaviour more frequently when compared to a more social desert rodent.

=== Reproduction ===
The fat sand rat breeds from autumn to early spring and produces litters usually consisting of one to eight pups, with average litter sizes increasing over the course of the breeding season. When mothers start lactating, their body energy increases, but towards the end of the lactation period, they begin to utilize stored energy instead of increasing body energy, resulting in a decrease in body mass. The growth rate of pups is maximized when the litter is small and the mother eats plants with a higher water content. The young disperse from their mother at about 5 weeks of age.

The sexual activity of male fat sand rats is not affected by weather conditions. However, there is a correlation between rainfall and the sexual activity of females, with more females being sexually active as the amount of rainfall increases. Reproductive strategies differ between the sexes, with females utilizing smaller ranges of space around their burrow with adequate food resources to provide for their young. Meanwhile, males occupy larger home ranges that overlap with multiple female ranges, creating the potential to mate with several females. Females initiate copulation and have stereotypical behaviours for approaching males, squealing and turning to dig in and kick sand towards the male. After this display, the female will exhibit lordosis, and the male will mount the female over a series of copulations. Often, a female will lose interest quickly, and will threaten or act aggressively towards the male between mounts.

== Medical significance ==
Although they remain lean when fed their natural, vegetable-based diet, fat sand rats can easily become obese and acquire type 2 diabetes mellitus when they are fed a normal rodent diet of grains. Therefore, they have been used as an animal model for studies on diabetes and obesity. Sequencing of the complete nuclear DNA genome of Psammomys obesus showed that the Pdx1 homeobox gene, a transcriptional activator of insulin, has undergone massive amino acid sequence changes in sand rat and other gerbil species driven by accumulation of GC-biased mutations (changes from A or T nucleotides to G or C nucleotides). It has been suggested that these changes affect function of the PDX1 protein and contributed to adaptation to low caloric intake or a diabetes-prone phenotype. However, a causative link has not been proven. Many regions of the sand rat genome, not only the Pdx1 gene, have been affected by accumulation of GC-biased mutations.

Because they are diurnal, fat sand rats are also used as models for human seasonal affective disorder.

The presence of fat sand rats in North Africa and the Middle East is of healthcare importance. Leishmania kDNA has been discovered in this rodent using molecular studies, suggesting the species can host the parasite that causes leishmaniasis in humans.

These animals have been studied extensively for their remarkably efficient kidneys: they can produce very concentrated urine, which enables them to eat halophyte plants and survive extreme heat and lack of water in their desert habitat.

== Gallery ==
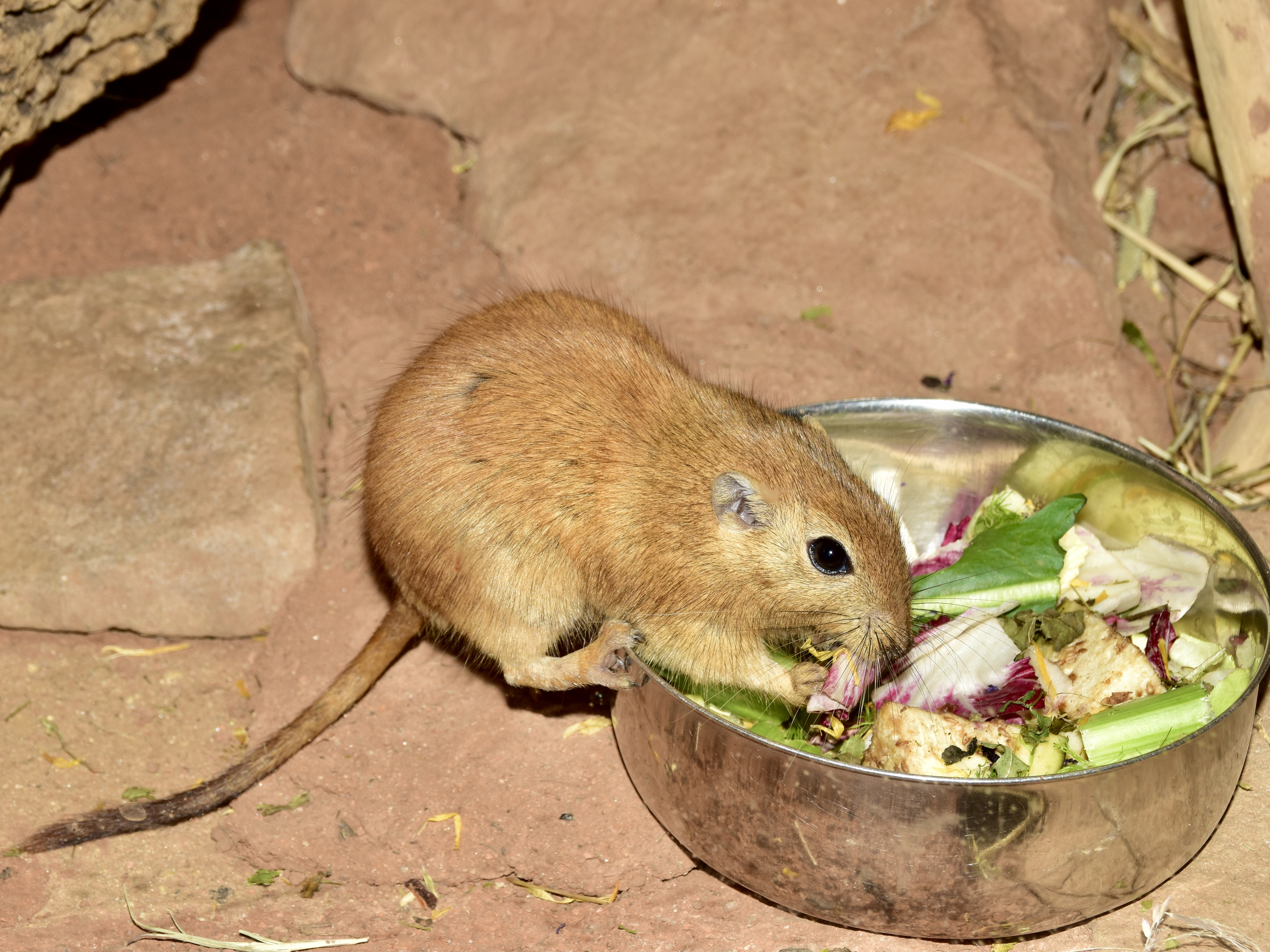
Psammomys obesus in Erlebnis-Zoo Hannover

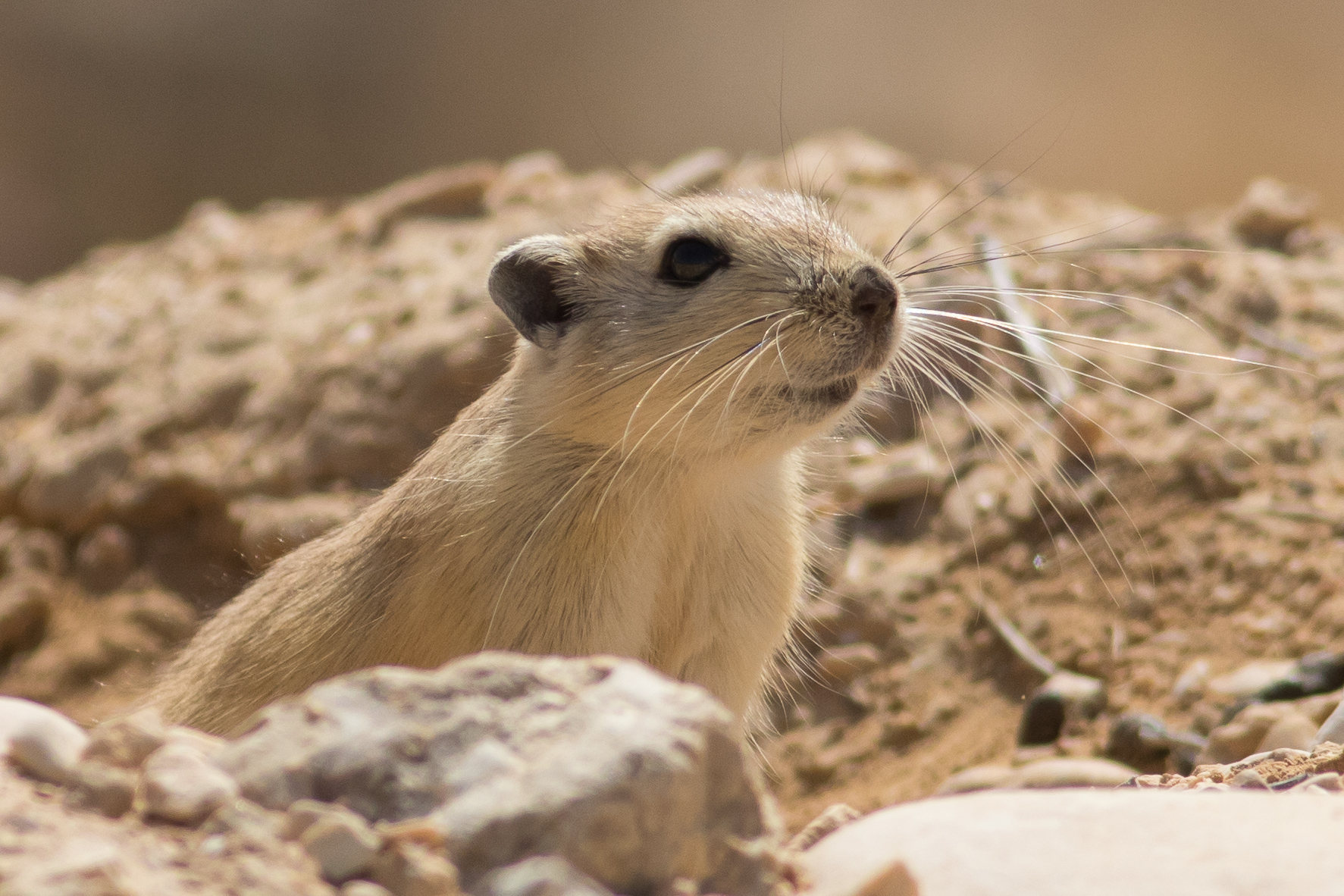
A sand rat in Israel
