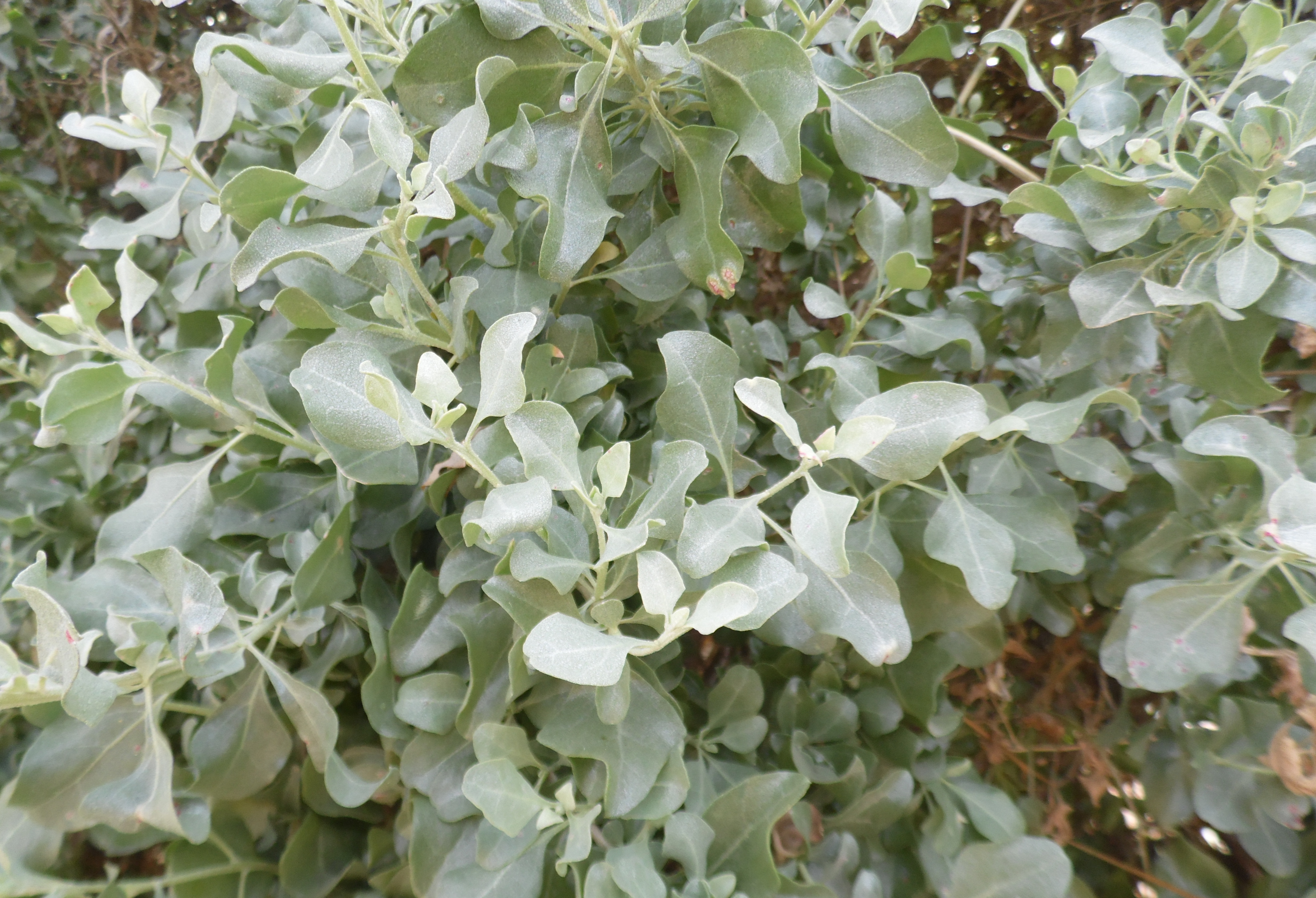

Conservation status
- Least Concern (IUCN 3.1)

Scientific classification
- Kingdom: Plantae
- Clade: Embryophytes
- Clade: Tracheophytes
- Clade: Angiosperms
- Clade: Eudicots
- Order: Caryophyllales
- Family: Amaranthaceae
- Genus: Atriplex
- Species: A. halimus

Binomial name
- Atriplex halimus L.

= Atriplex halimus =

Species of flowering plant

Atriplex halimus (known also by its common names: Mediterranean saltbush, sea orache, shrubby orache, silvery orache; /ˈɒrətʃ/; also spelled orach) is a species of fodder shrub in the family Amaranthaceae.

== Description ==
The plant has small gray leaves up to 2.5 centimetres (1 inch) long. It resembles Chenopodium berlandieri (lamb's quarters).

== Distribution and habitat ==
The plant is widespread through the Mediterranean Basin, North and East Africa and the Arabian Peninsula.

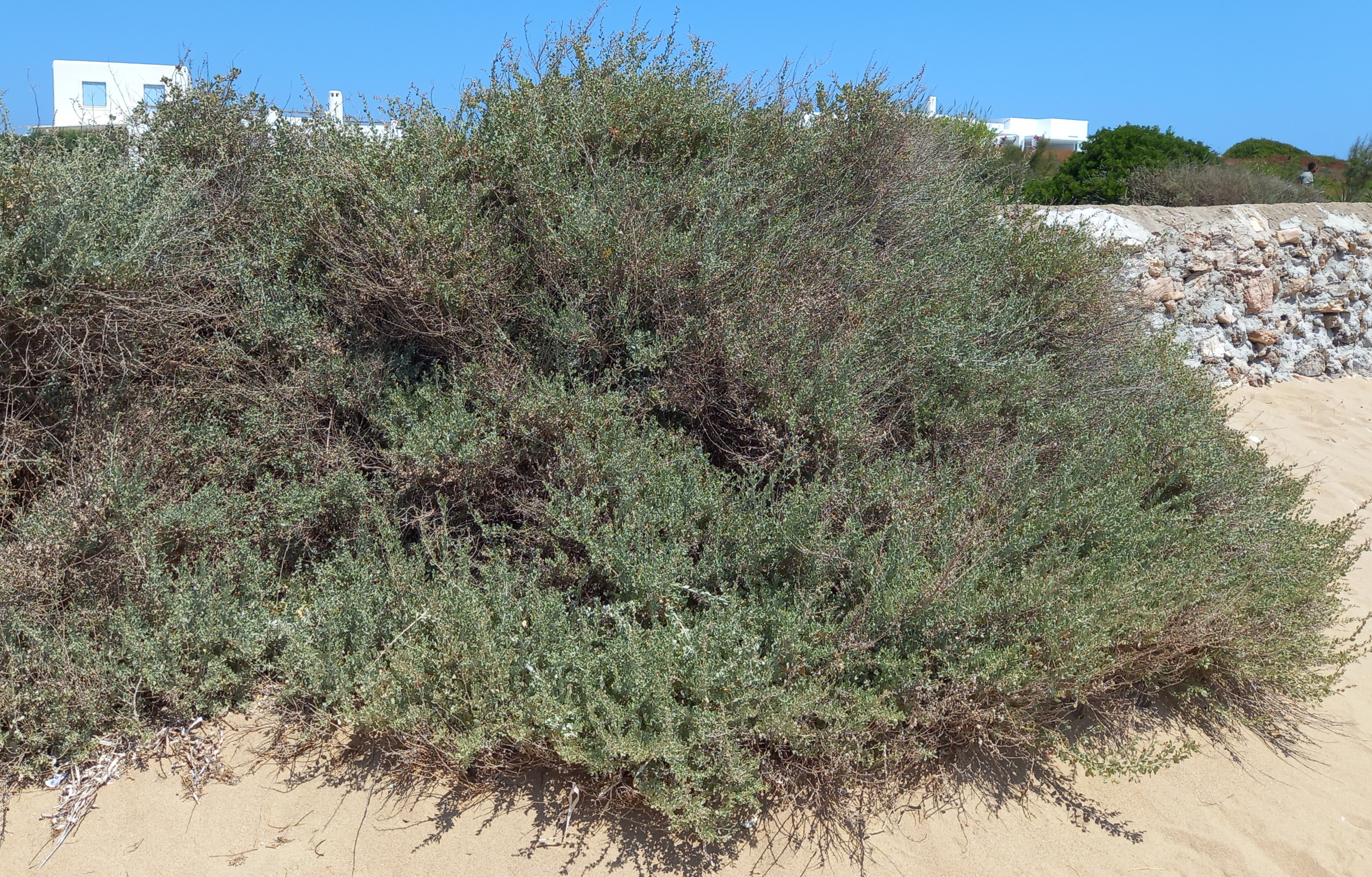
Bush on a Mediterranean beach

== Ecology ==
The leaves are a dietary staple for the sand rat (Psammomys obesus).

== Uses ==
The leaves are edible. Extracts from the leaves have shown to have significant hypoglycemic effects.

The species has potential use in agriculture. A study allowed sheep and goats to voluntarily feed on A. halimus and aimed to determine if the saltbush was palatable, and if so, did it provide enough nutrients to supplement the diet of these animals. In this study they determined when goats and sheep are given as much A. halimus as they like, they do obtain enough nutrients to supplement their diet – unless the animal requirements are higher during pregnancy and milk production.

This plant is often cultivated as forage because of its tolerance for severe conditions of drought, and it can grow easily in very alkaline and saline soils. In addition, it is useful to valorize degraded and marginal areas because it will contribute to the improvement of phytomass in this case.

== Use in antiquity ==
According to Jewish tradition, the leaves of Atriplex halimus are known in biblical Hebrew (see: Job 30:4) as maluaḥ (Hebrew: מלוח), and which are said to have been gathered and eaten by the poor people who returned out of Babylonian exile (c. 352 BCE) to build the Second Temple. Other classical Hebrew sources put the Mishnaic name of this edible plant as faʻfōʻīn (Hebrew: פעפועין), a plant that is explained to mean qaqūlei in Aramaic, said to be the al-qāqlah (القاقلة) in Arabic.

The Greek comic poet Antiphanes seemingly calls it halimon and refers to foraging for it in dry torrent beds.

The plant is mentioned again in the Middle Ages by Ishtori Haparchi in his 14th-century work Kaftor va-Ferach (Hebrew: כפתור ופרח), noting that it grows in the Jordan Valley region.
