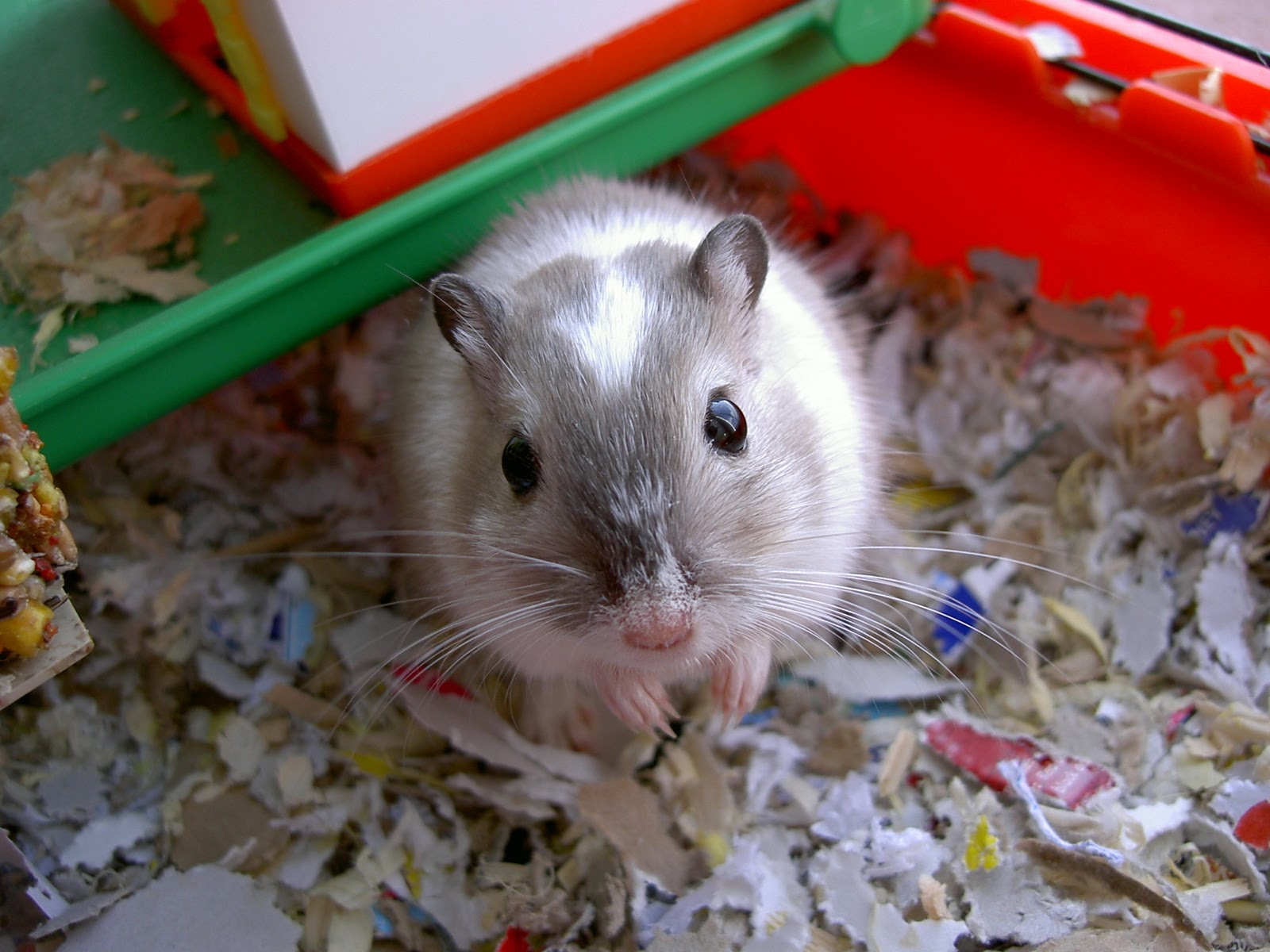

Scientific classification
- Kingdom: Animalia
- Phylum: Chordata
- Class: Mammalia
- Order: Rodentia
- Family: Muridae
- Subfamily: Gerbillinae; Gray, 1825

Genera
- Ammodillus; Brachiones; Desmodilliscus; Desmodillus; Dipodillus; Gerbilliscus; Gerbillurus; Gerbillus; Meriones; Microdillus; Pachyuromys; Psammomys; Rhombomys; Sekeetamys; Tatera; Taterillus

= Gerbillinae =

Gerbil Temporal range: Late Miocene – Recent

Subfamily of rodents

Gerbillinae is one of the subfamilies of the rodent family Muridae and includes the gerbils, jirds, and sand rats. Once known as desert rats, the subfamily includes about 110 species of African, Indian, and Asian rodents, including sand rats and jirds, all of which are adapted to arid habitats. Most are primarily active during the day, making them diurnal (but some species, including the common household pet, exhibit crepuscular behavior), and almost all are omnivorous.

The gerbil got its name as a diminutive form of "jerboa", an unrelated group of rodents occupying a similar ecological niche. Gerbils are typically between 150 and 300 mm (6 and 12 in) long, including the tail, which makes up about half of their total length. One species, the great gerbil (Rhombomys opimus), originally native to Turkmenistan, can grow to more than 400 mm (16 in). The average adult gerbil weighs about 70 grams (2 1/2 ounces).

One species, the Mongolian gerbil (Meriones unguiculatus), also known as the clawed jird, is a gentle and hardy animal that has become a popular small house pet. It is also used in some scientific research.

== Classification ==
SUBFAMILY GERBILLINAE

  - Genus Ammodillus
    - Ammodile, Ammodillus imbellis
- Tribe Desmodilliscini
  - Genus Desmodilliscus
    - Pouched gerbil, Desmodilliscus braueri
  - Genus Pachyuromys
    - Fat-tailed gerbil, Pachyuromys duprasi
- Tribe Gerbillini
  - Subtribe Gerbillina
    - Genus Dipodillus
      - Botta's gerbil, Dipodillus bottai
      - North African gerbil, Dipodillus campestris
      - Wagner's gerbil, Dipodillus dasyurus
      - Harwood's gerbil, Dipodillus harwoodi
      - James's gerbil, Dipodillus jamesi
      - Lowe's gerbil, Dipodillus lowei
      - Mackilligin's gerbil, Dipodillus mackilligini
      - Greater short-tailed gerbil, Dipodillus maghrebi
      - Rupicolous gerbil, Dipodillus rupicola
      - Lesser short-tailed gerbil, Dipodillus simoni
      - Somalian gerbil, Dipodillus somalicus
      - Khartoum gerbil, Dipodillus stigmonyx
      - Kerkennah Islands gerbil, Dipodillus zakariai
    - Genus Gerbillus
      - Subgenus Hendecapleura
        - Pleasant gerbil, Gerbillus amoenus
        - Brockman's gerbil, Gerbillus brockmani
        - Black-tufted gerbil, Gerbillus famulus
        - Algerian gerbil, Gerbillus garamantis
        - Grobben's gerbil, Gerbillus grobbeni
        - Pygmy gerbil, Gerbillus henleyi
        - Mauritanian gerbil, Gerbillus mauritaniae (sometimes considered a separate genus Monodia)
        - Harrison's gerbil, Gerbillus mesopotamiae
        - Darfur gerbil, Gerbillus muriculus
        - Balochistan gerbil, Gerbillus nanus
        - Large Aden gerbil, Gerbillus poecilops
        - Principal gerbil, Gerbillus principulus
        - Least gerbil, Gerbillus pusillus
        - Sand gerbil, Gerbillus syrticus
        - Waters's gerbil, Gerbillus watersi
      - Subgenus Gerbillus
        - Berbera gerbil, Gerbillus acticola
        - Agag gerbil, Gerbillus agag
        - Anderson's gerbil, Gerbillus andersoni
        - Swarthy gerbil, Gerbillus aquilus
        - Burton's gerbil, Gerbillus burtoni
        - Cheesman's gerbil, Gerbillus cheesmani
        - Dongola gerbil, Gerbillus dongolanus
        - Somalia gerbil, Gerbillus dunni
        - Flower's gerbil, Gerbillus floweri
        - Lesser Egyptian gerbil, Gerbillus gerbillus
        - Indian hairy-footed gerbil, Gerbillus gleadowi
        - Western gerbil, Gergbillus hesperinus
        - Hoogstraal's gerbil, Gerbillus hoogstraali
        - Lataste's gerbil, Gerbillus latastei
        - Sudan gerbil, Gerbillus nancillus
        - Nigerian gerbil, Gerbillus nigeriae
        - Occidental gerbil, Gerbillus occiduus
        - Pale gerbil, Gerbillus perpallidus
        - Cushioned gerbil, Gerbillus pulvinatus
        - Greater Egyptian gerbil, Gerbillus pyramidum
        - Rosalinda gerbil, Gerbillus rosalinda
        - Tarabul's gerbil, Gerbillus tarabuli
    - Genus Microdillus
      - Somali pygmy gerbil, Microdillus peeli
  - Subtribe Rhombomyina
    - Genus Brachiones
      - Przewalski's gerbil, Brachiones przewalskii
    - Genus Meriones
      - Subgenus Meriones
        - Tamarisk jird, Meriones tamariscinus
      - Subgenus Parameriones
        - Persian jird, Meriones persicus
        - King jird, Meriones rex
      - Subgenus Pallasiomys
        - Arabian jird, Meriones arimalius
        - Cheng's jird, Meriones chengi
        - Sundevall's jird, Meriones crassus
        - Dahl's jird, Meriones dahli
        - Moroccan jird, Meriones grandis
        - Libyan jird, Meriones libycus
        - Midday jird, Meriones meridianus
        - Buxton's jird, Meriones sacramenti
        - Shaw's jird, Meriones shawi
        - Tristram's jird, Meriones tristrami
        - Mongolian jird (Mongolian Gerbil), Meriones unguiculatus
        - Vinogradov's jird, Meriones vinogradovi
        - Zarudny's jird, Meriones zarudnyi
      - Subgenus Cheliones
        - Indian desert jird, Meriones hurrianae
    - Genus Psammomys
      - Fat sand rat, Psammomys obesus
      - Thin sand rat, Psammomys vexillaris
    - Genus Rhombomys
      - Great gerbil, Rhombomys opimus
  - Incertae sedis
    - Genus Sekeetamys
      - Bushy-tailed jird, Sekeetamys calurus
- Tribe Gerbillurini
  - Genus Desmodillus
    - Cape short-eared gerbil, Desmodillus auricularis
  - Genus Gerbilliscus
    - Cape gerbil, Gerbilliscus afra
    - Boehm's gerbil, Gerbilliscus boehmi
    - Highveld gerbil, Gerbilliscus brantsii
    - Guinean gerbil, Gerbilliscus guineae
    - Gorongoza gerbil, Gerbilliscus inclusus
    - Kemp's gerbil, Gerbilliscus kempi
    - Bushveld gerbil, Gerbilliscus leucogaster
    - Black-tailed gerbil, Gerbilliscus nigricaudus
    - Phillips's gerbil, Gerbilliscus phillipsi
    - Fringe-tailed gerbil, Gerbilliscus robustus
    - Savanna gerbil, Gerbilliscus validus
  - Genus Gerbillurus
    - Hairy-footed gerbil, Gerbillurus paeba
    - Namib brush-tailed gerbil, Gerbillurus setzeri
    - Dune hairy-footed gerbil, Gerbillurus tytonis
    - Bushy-tailed hairy-footed gerbil, Gerbillurus vallinus
  - Genus Tatera
    - Indian gerbil, Tatera indica
- Tribe Taterillini
  - Genus Taterillus
    - Robbins's tateril, Taterillus arenarius
    - Congo gerbil, Taterillus congicus
    - Emin's gerbil, Taterillus emini
    - Gracile tateril, Taterillus gracilis
    - Harrington's gerbil, Taterillus harringtoni
    - Lake Chad gerbil, Taterillus lacustris
    - Petter's gerbil, Taterillus petteri
    - Senegal gerbil, Taterillus pygargus
    - Tranieri's tateril, Taterillus tranieri
