= List of wild animals of Egypt =

This is a list of the wild animal species that were reported in Egypt.

== Class: Mammalia (mammals) ==
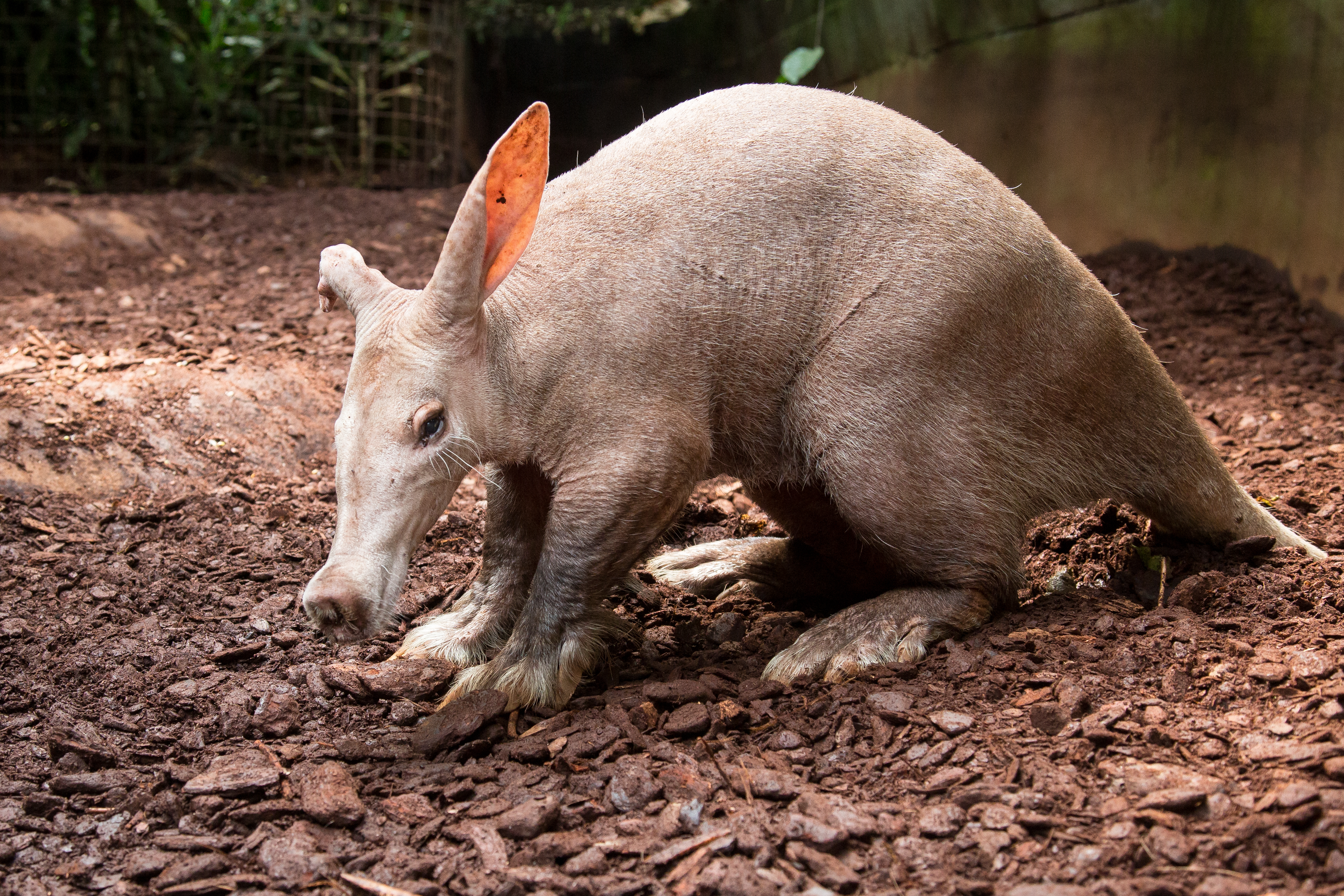
Aardvark

Order: Tubulidentata (aardvarks)

- Family: Orycteropodidae
  - Genus: Orycteropus
    - Aardvark

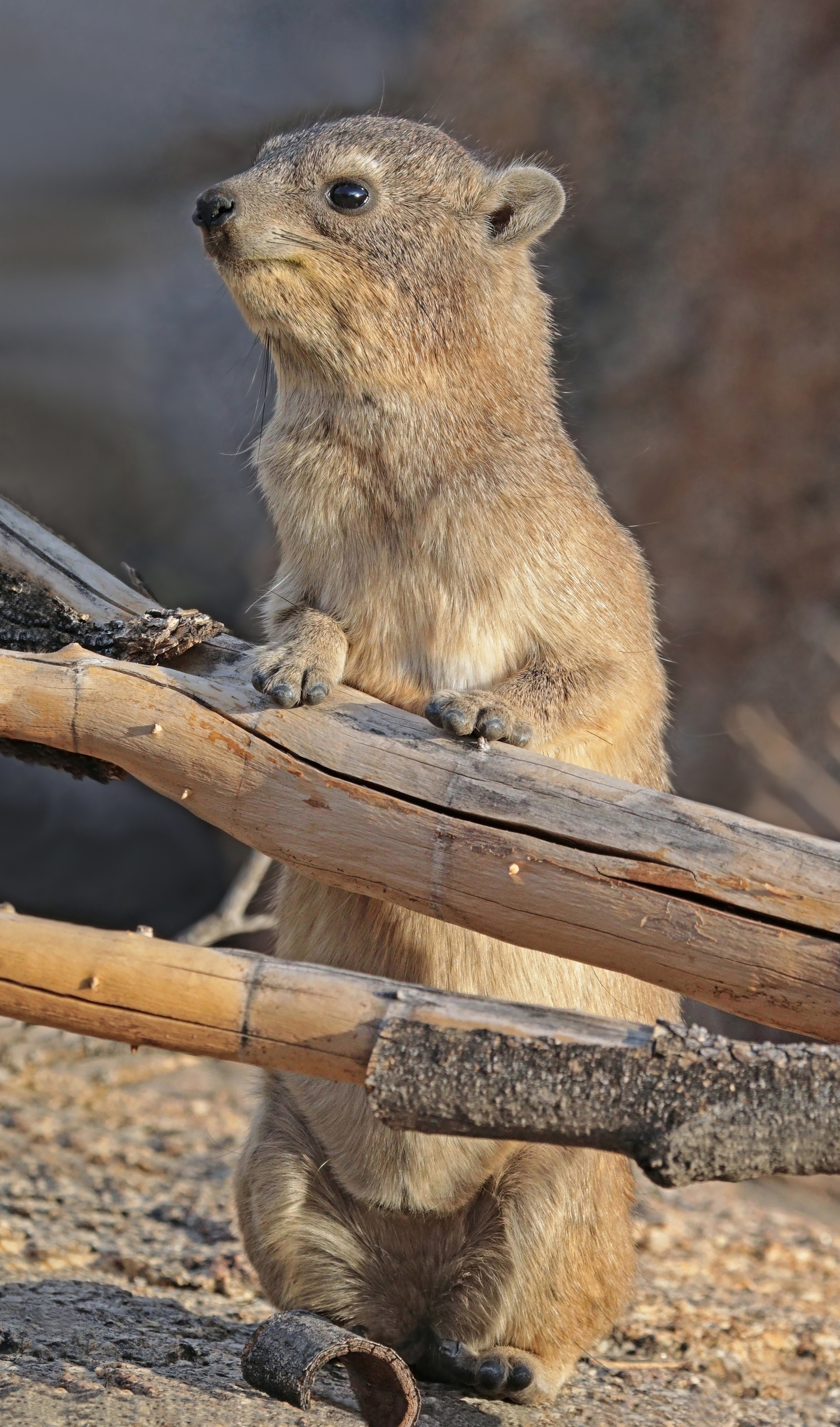
Rock hyrax

Order: Hyracoidea (hyraxes)

- Family: Procaviidae (hyraxes)
  - Genus: Procavia
    - Rock hyrax

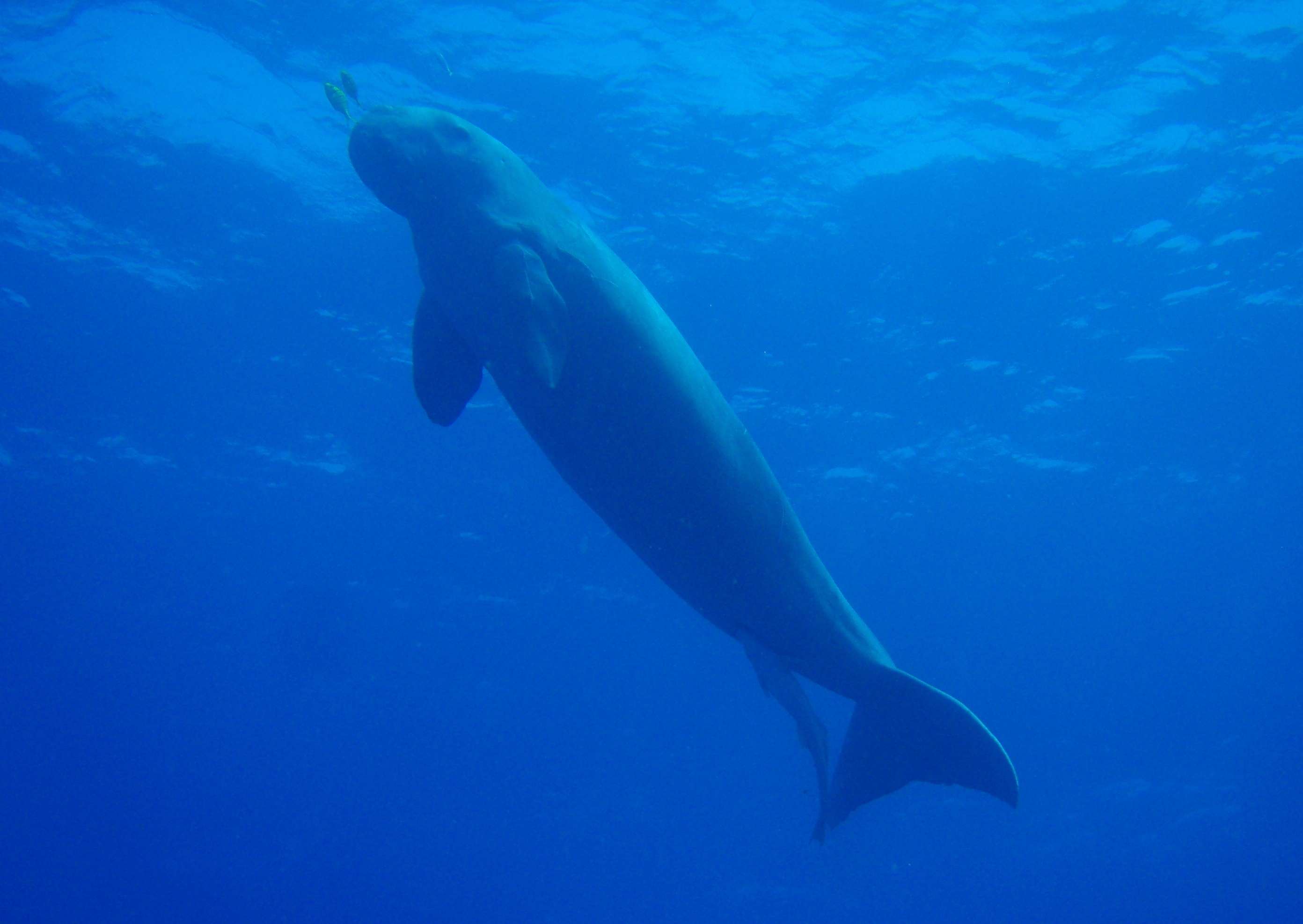
Dugong

Order: Sirenia (manatees and dugongs)

- Family: Dugongidae
  - Genus: Dugong
    - Dugong (dugong dugon)

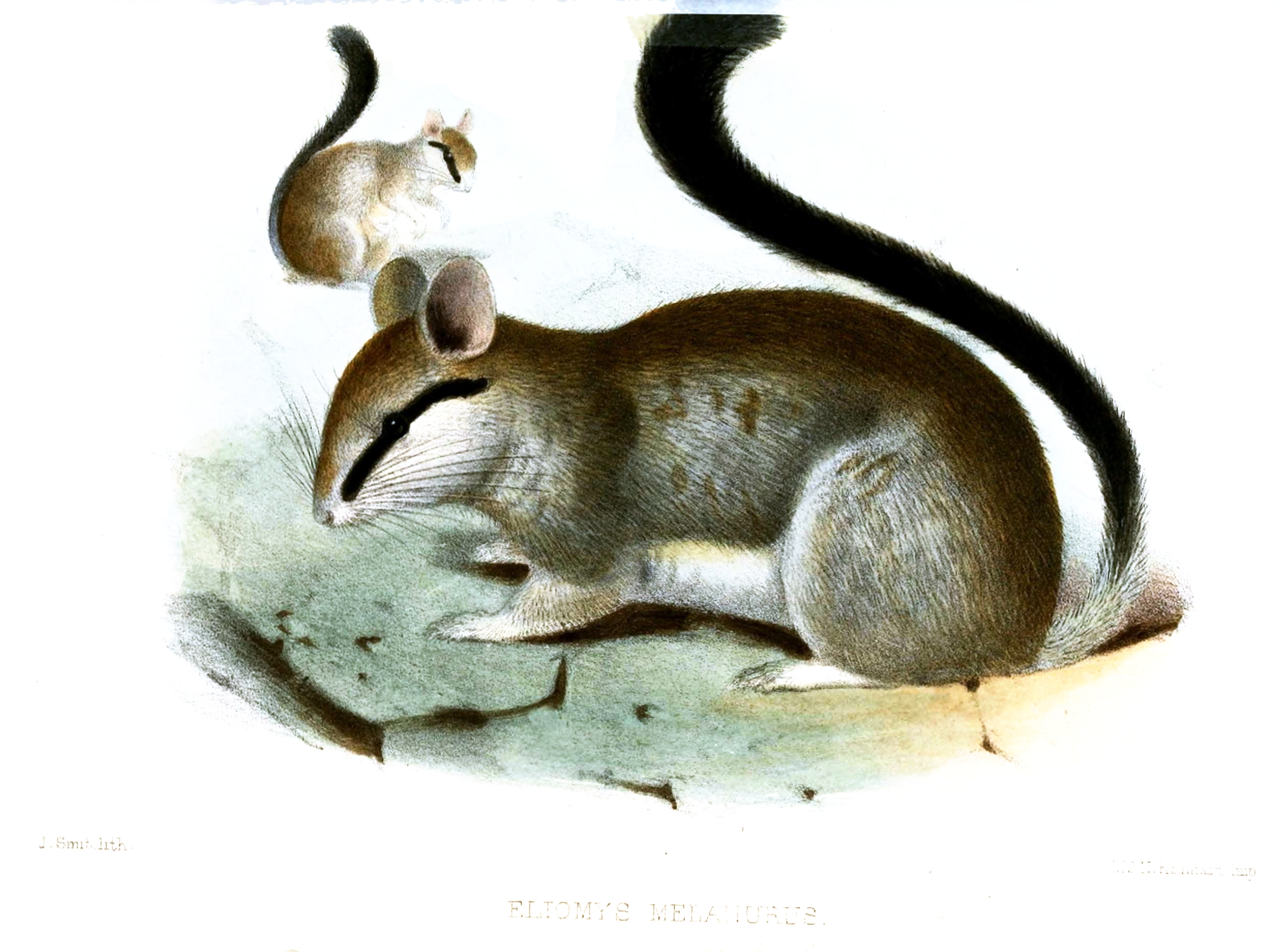
Asian garden dormouse

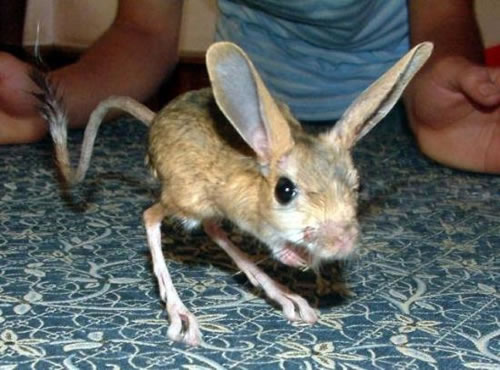
Four-toed jerboa

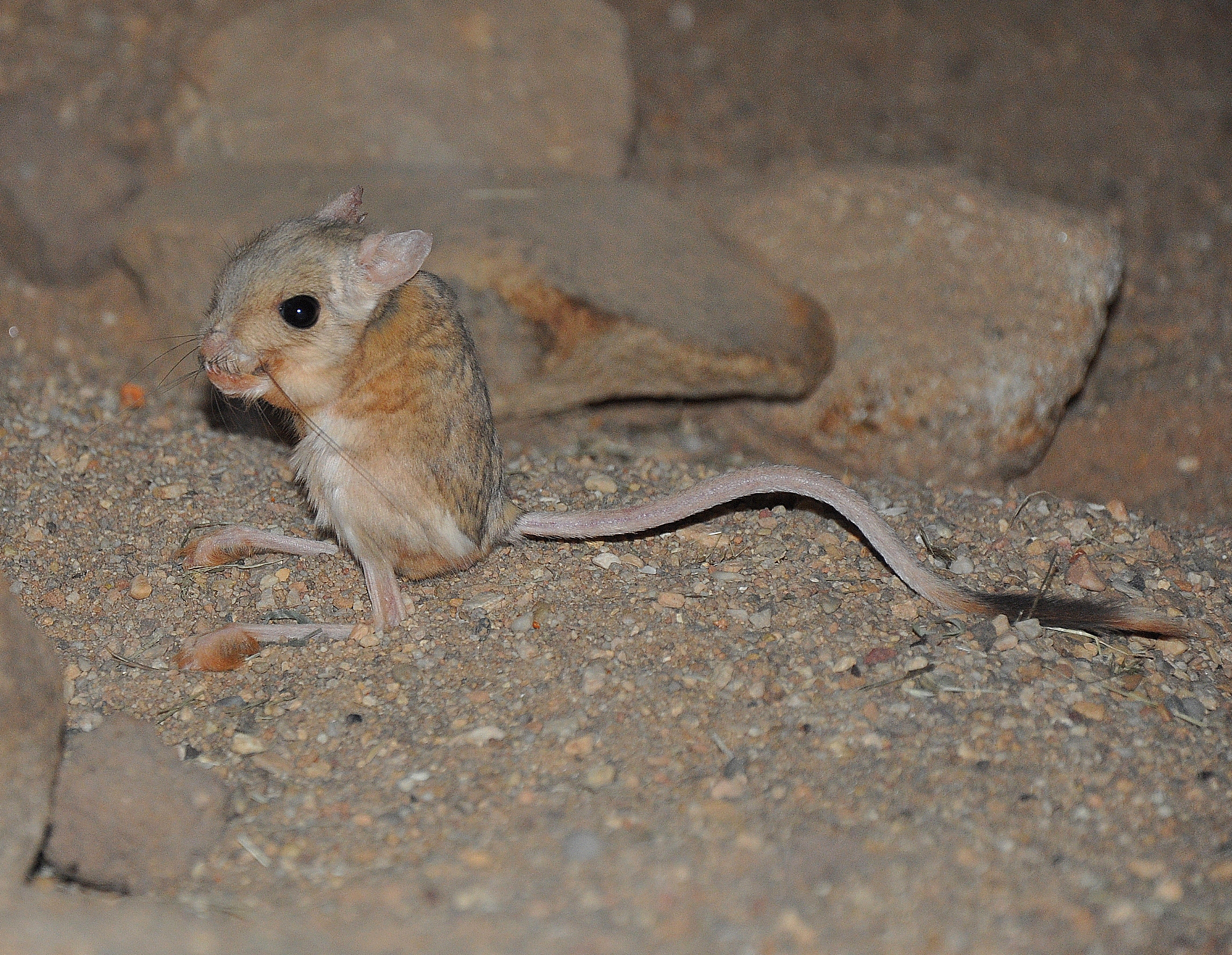
Lesser Egyptian jerboa

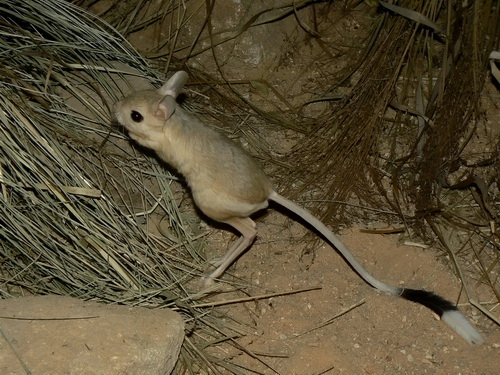
Greater Egyptian jerboa

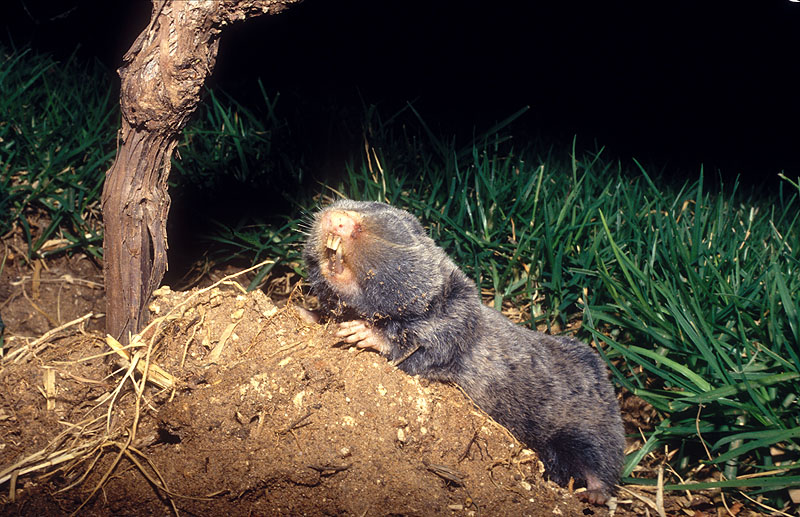
Middle East blind mole-rat

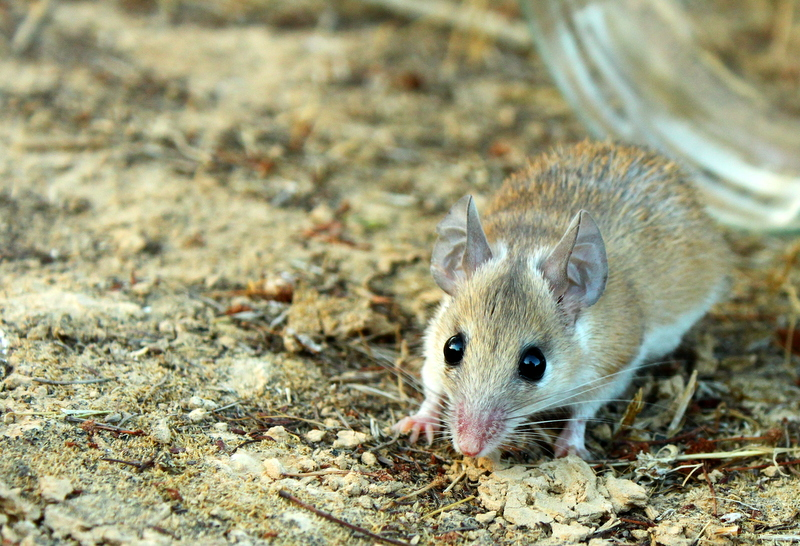
Cairo spiny mouse

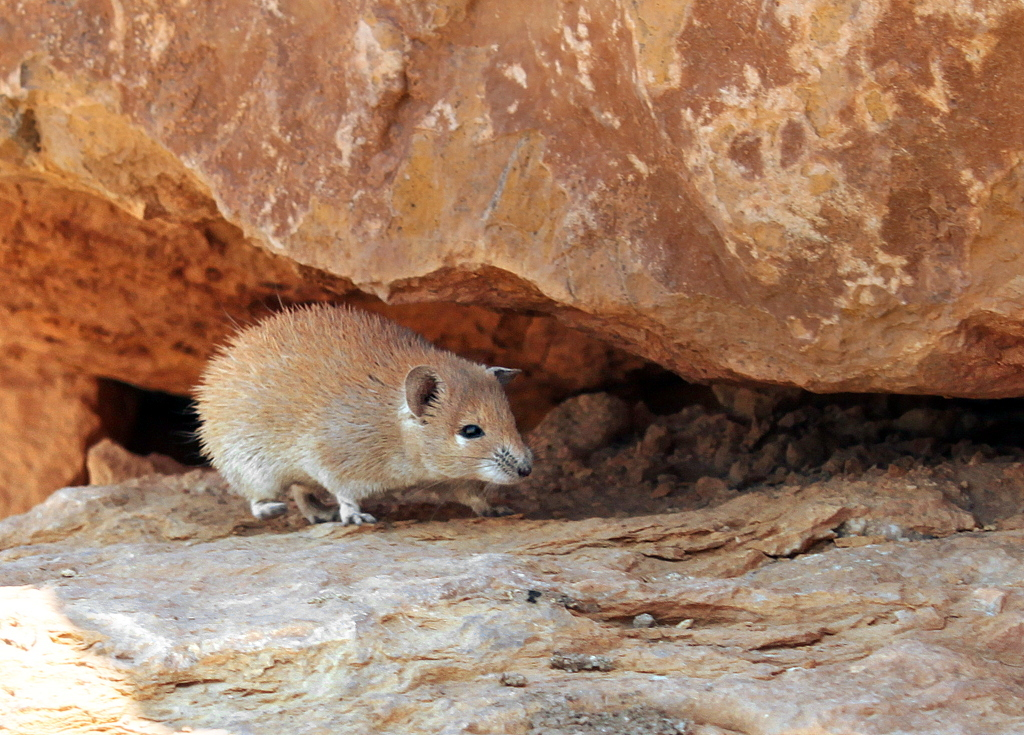
Golden spiny mouse

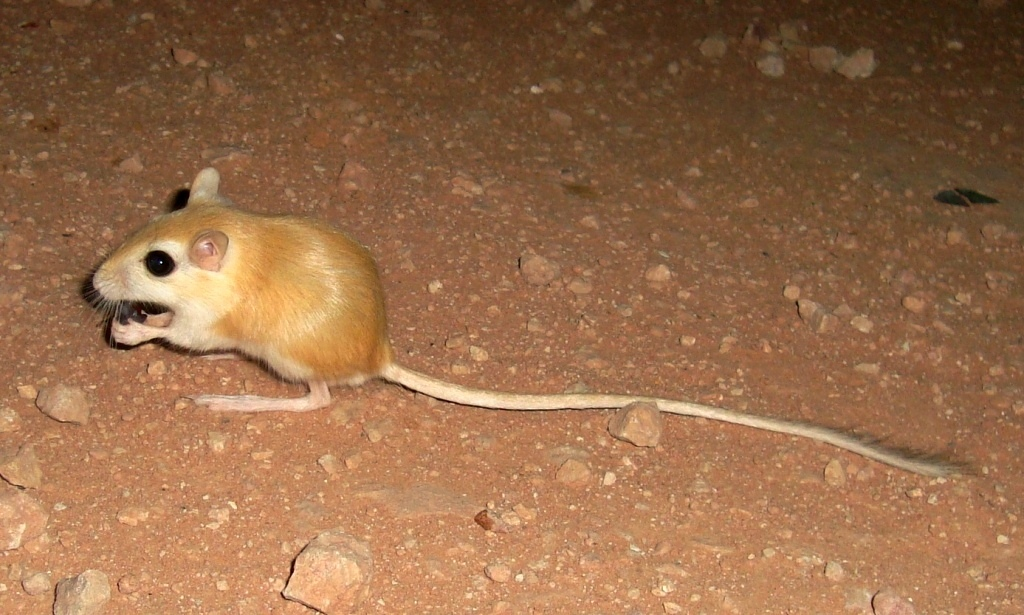
North African gerbil

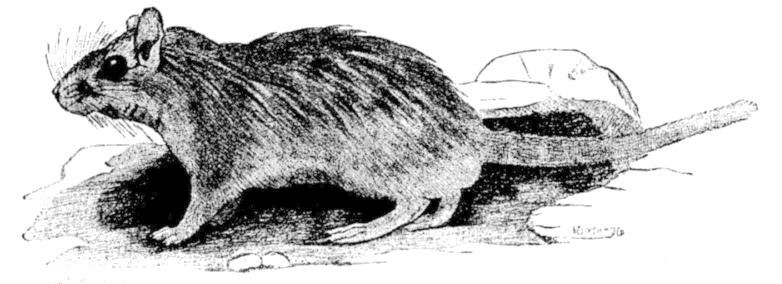
Lesser Egyptian gerbil

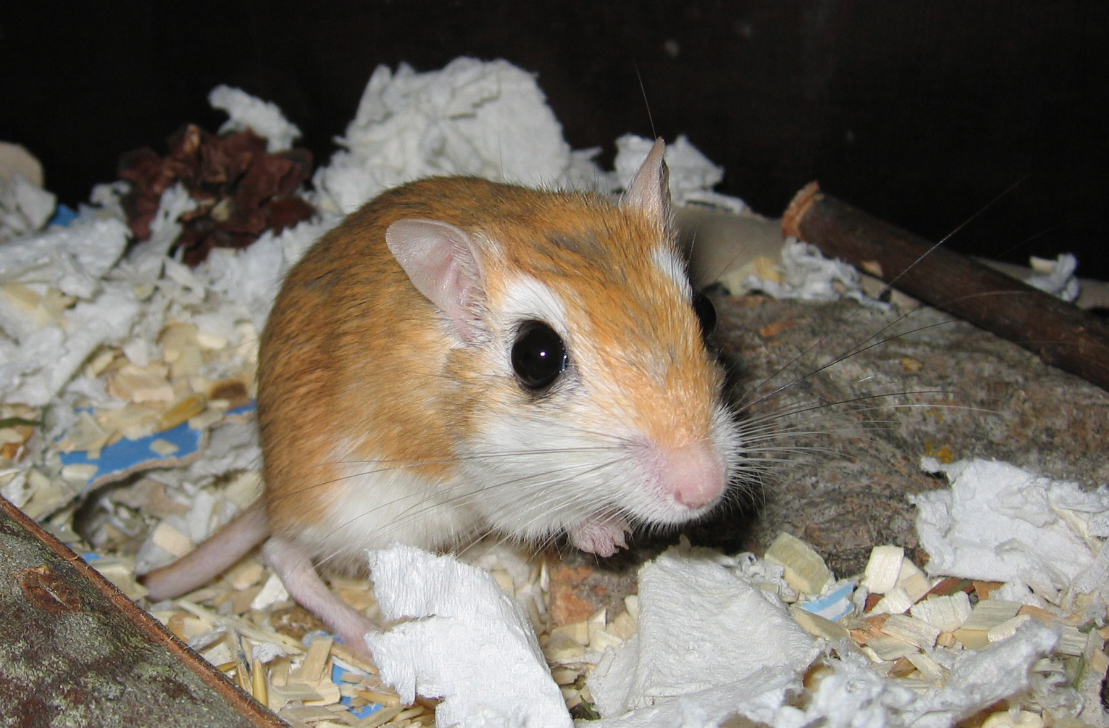
Pale gerbil

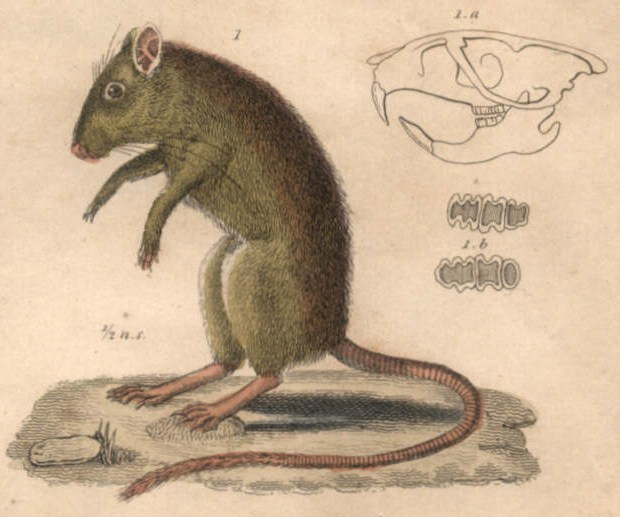
Greater Egyptian gerbil

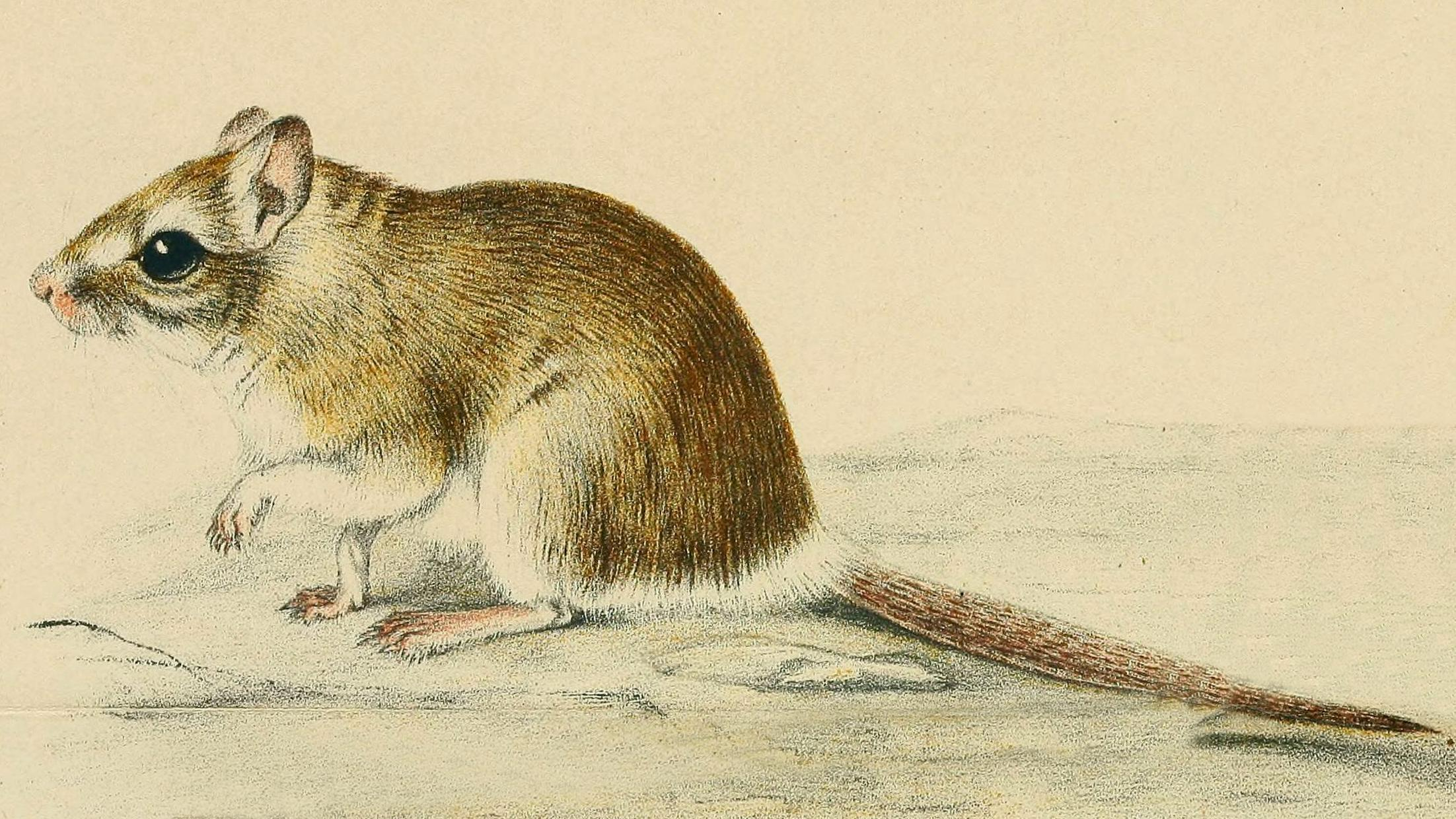
Lesser short-tailed gerbil

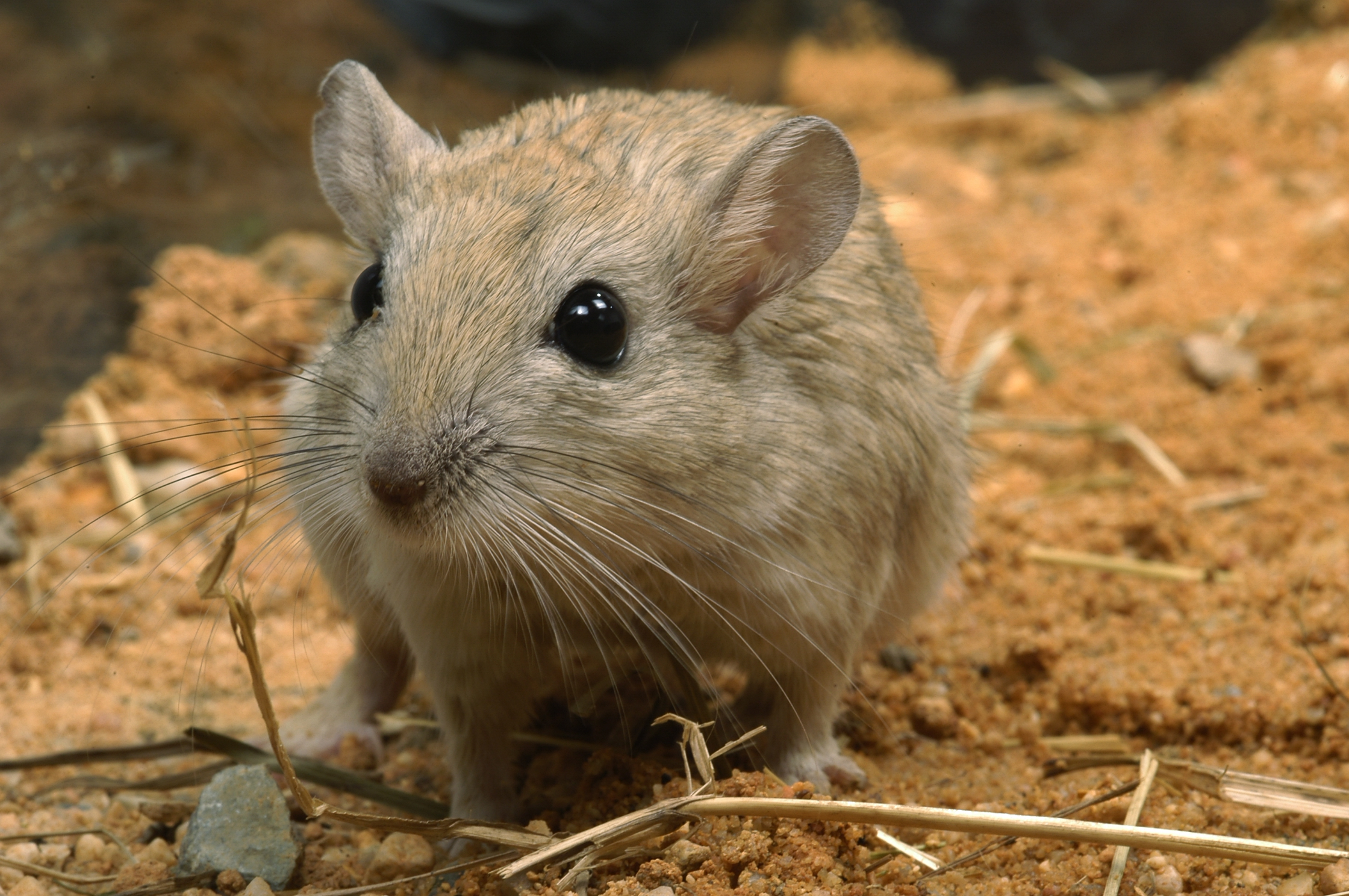
Sundevall's jird

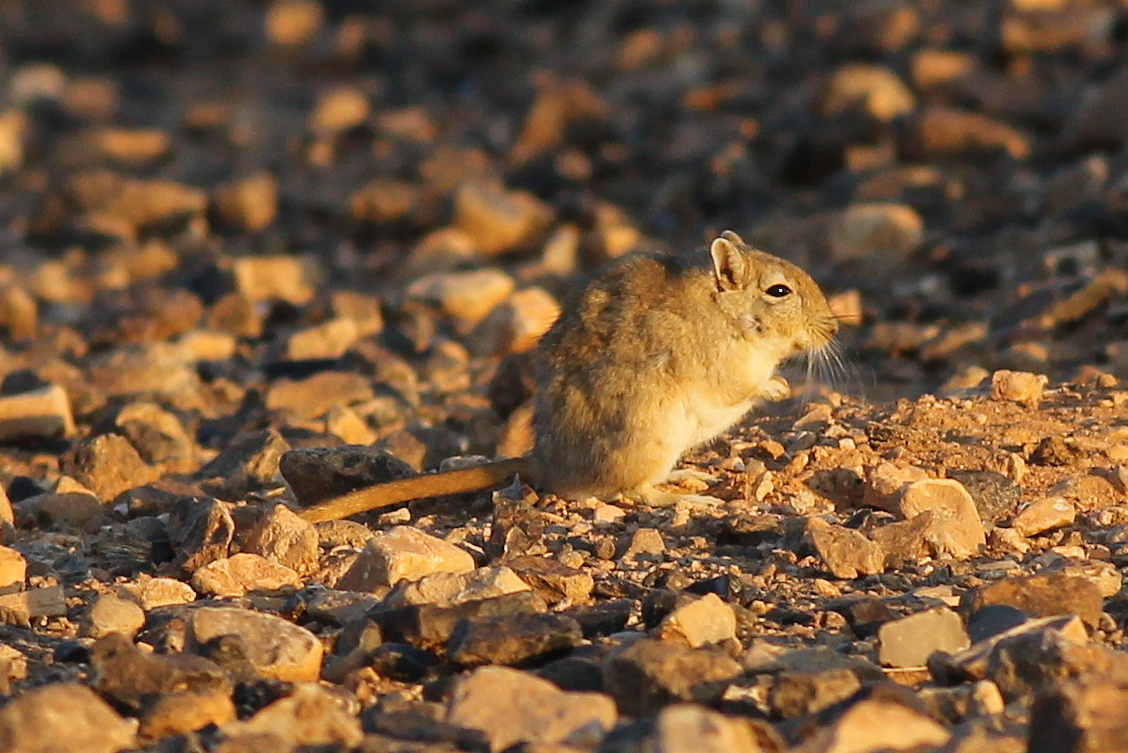
Libyan jird

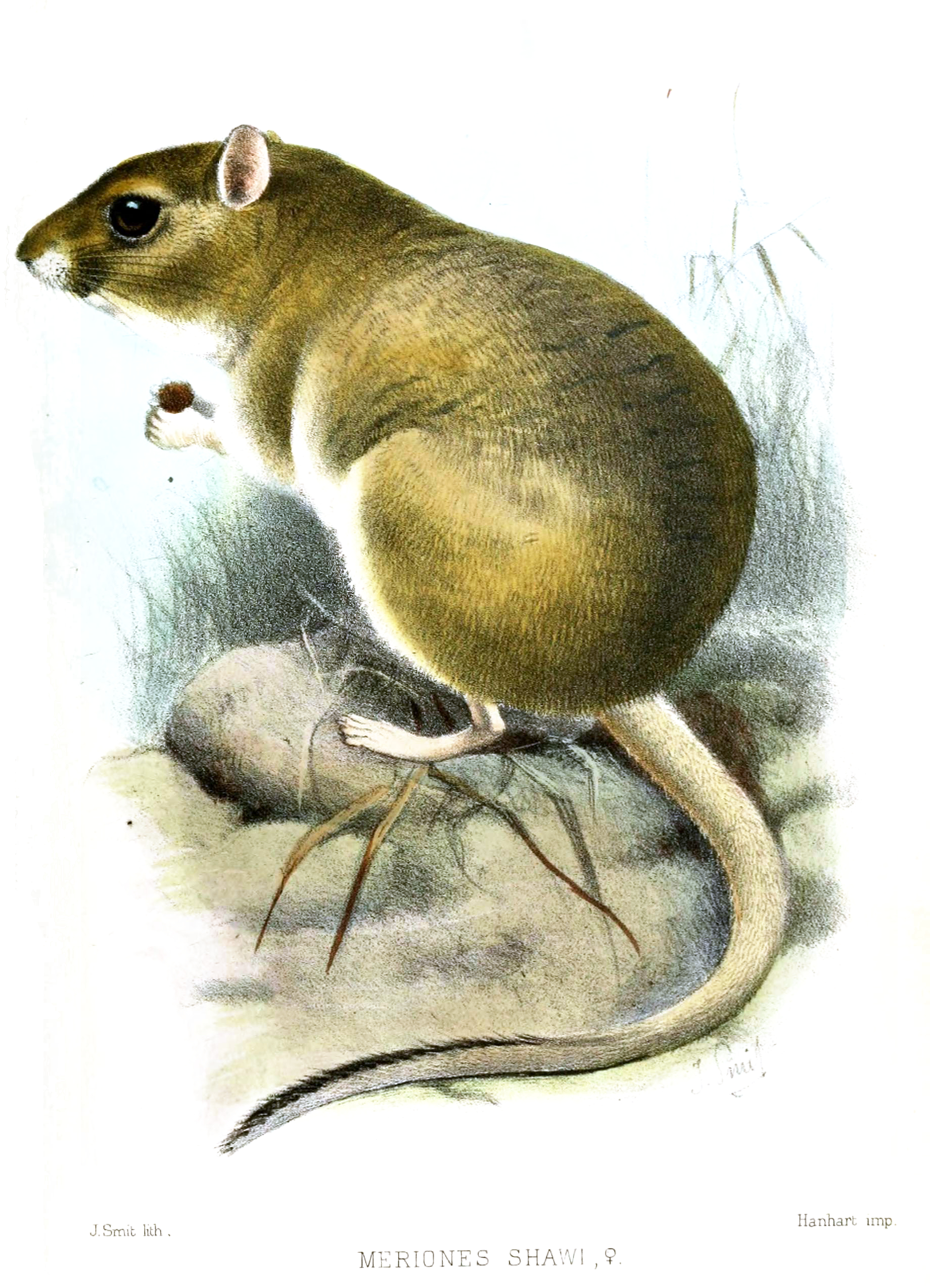
Shaw's jird

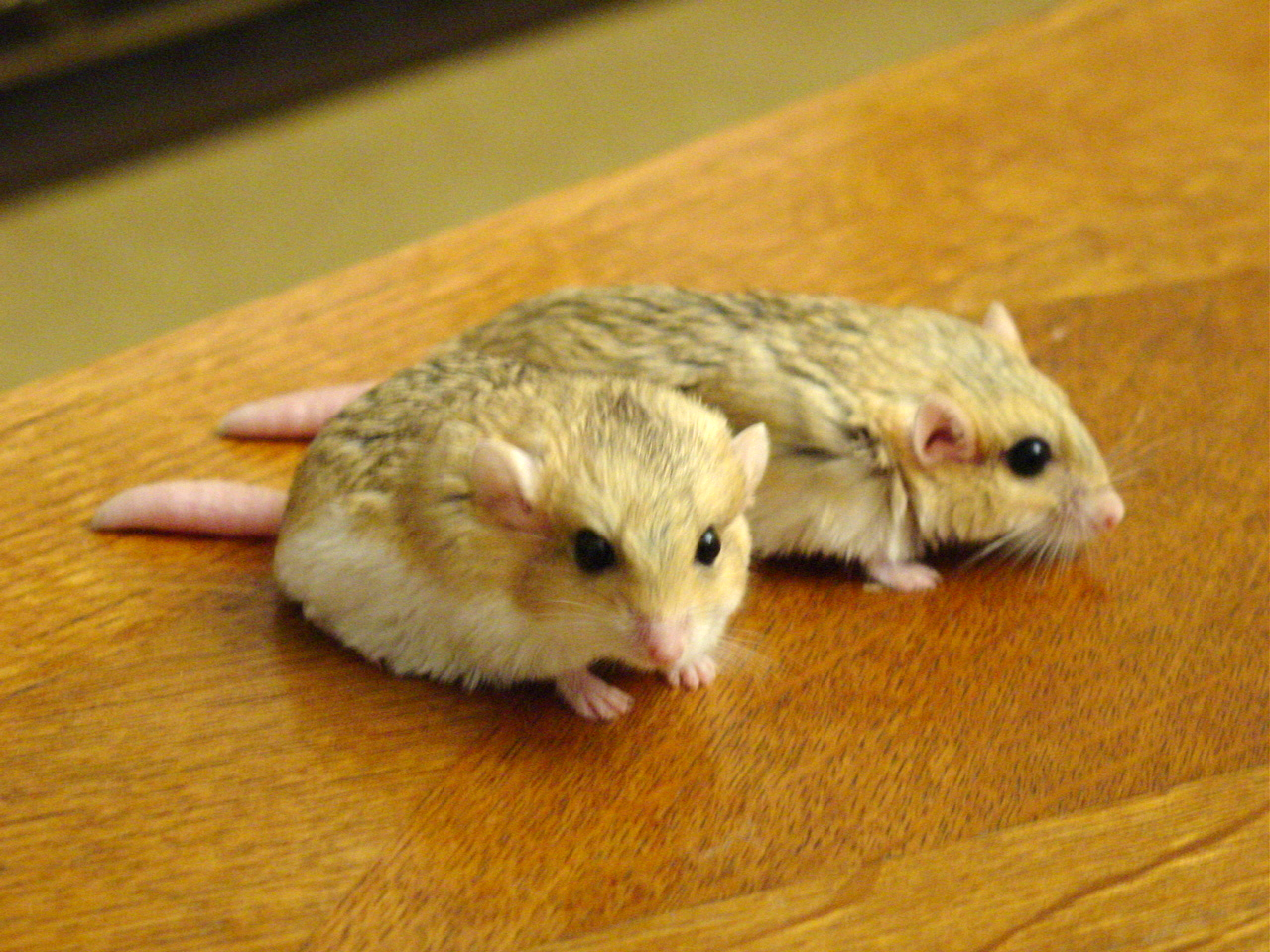
Fat-tailed gerbil

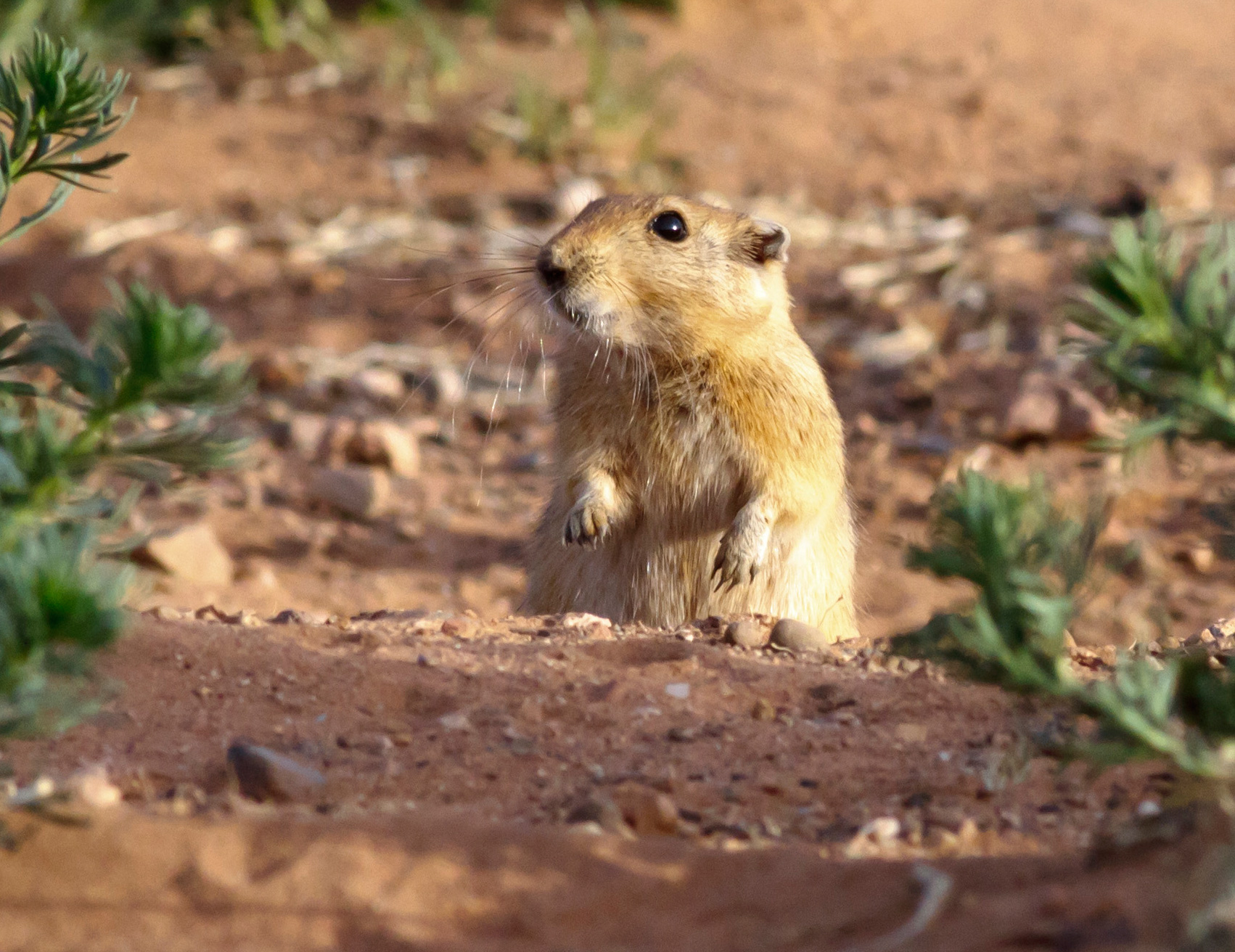
Fat sand rat

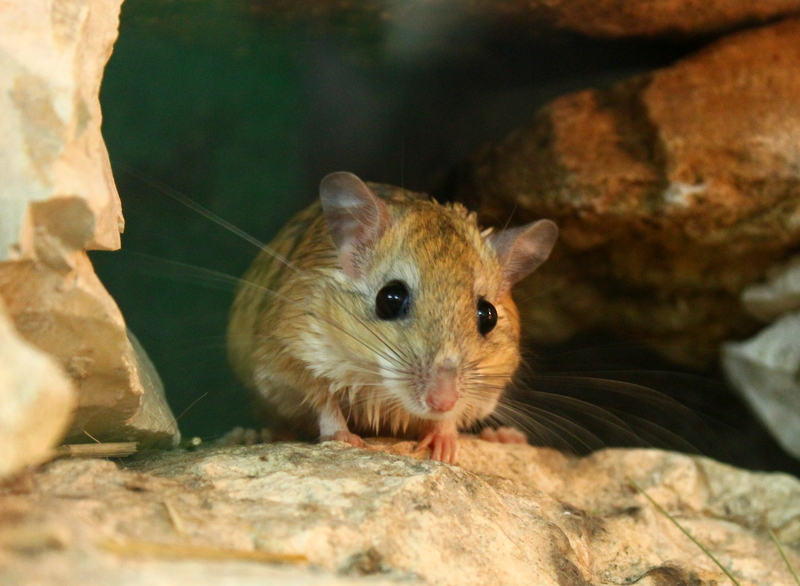
Bushy-tailed jird

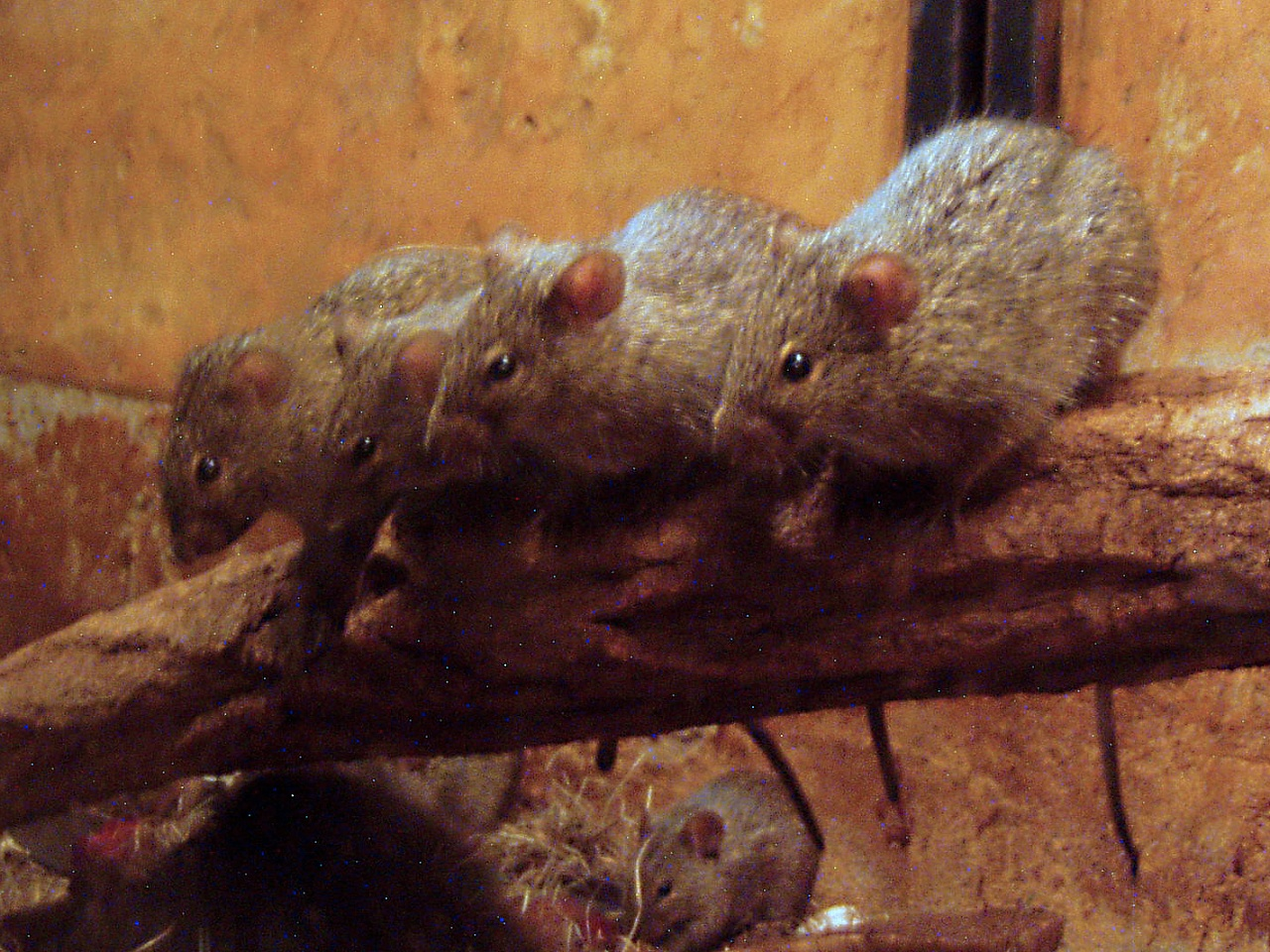
African grass rat

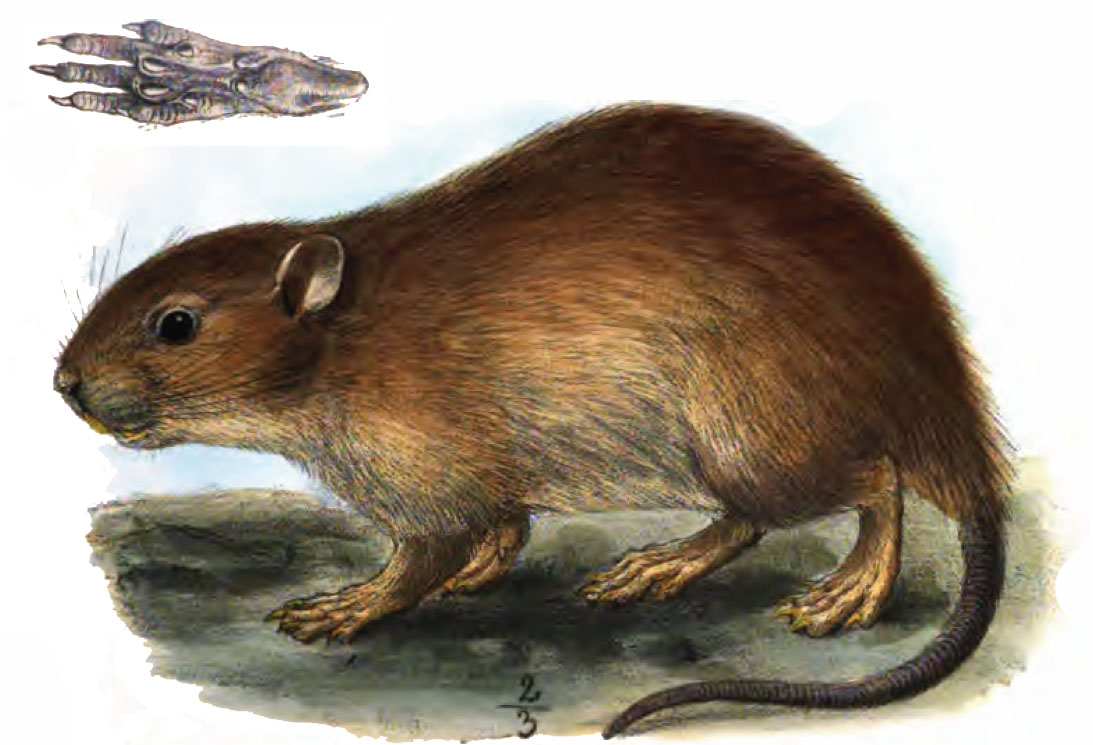
Short-tailed bandicoot rat

Order: Rodentia (rodents)

- Family: Gliridae (dormice)
  - Genus: Eliomys
    - Asian garden dormouse Eliomys melanurus
- Family: Dipodidae (jerboas)
  - Genus: Allactaga
    - Four-toed jerboa (Allactaga tetradactyla)
  - Genus: Jaculus
    - Lesser Egyptian jerboa (Jaculus jaculus)
    - Greater Egyptian jerboa (Jaculus orientalis)
- Family: Spalacidae
  - Genus: Nannospalax
    - Middle East blind mole-rat Nannospalax ehrenbergi
- Family: Muridae (mice, rats, voles, gerbils, hamsters etc.)
  - Genus: Acomys
    - Cairo spiny mouse (Acomys cahirinus)
    - Golden spiny mouse (Acomys russatus)
  - Genus: Dipodillus
    - North African gerbil Dipodillus campestris
    - Mackilligin's gerbil (Dipodillus mackilligini)
  - Genus: Gerbillus
    - Pleasant gerbil Gerbillus amoenus
    - Anderson's gerbil Gerbillus andersoni
    - Flower's gerbil Gerbillus floweri
    - Lesser Egyptian gerbil Gerbillus gerbillus
    - Pygmy gerbil Gerbillus henleyi
    - Pale gerbil Gerbillus perpallidus
    - Greater Egyptian gerbil Gerbillus pyramidum
    - Lesser short-tailed gerbil Gerbillus simoni
  - Genus: Meriones
    - Sundevall's jird Meriones crassus
    - Libyan jird Meriones lybicus
    - Shaw's jird Meriones shawi
  - Genus: Pachyuromys
    - Fat-tailed gerbil (pachyuromys duprasi)
  - Genus: Psammomys
    - Fat sand rat (psammomys obesus)
  - Genus: Sekeetamys
    - Bushy-tailed jird (sekeetamys calurus)
  - Genus: Arvicanthis
    - African grass rat (arvicanthis niloticus)
  - Genus: Nesokia
    - Short-tailed bandicoot rat (nesokia indica)

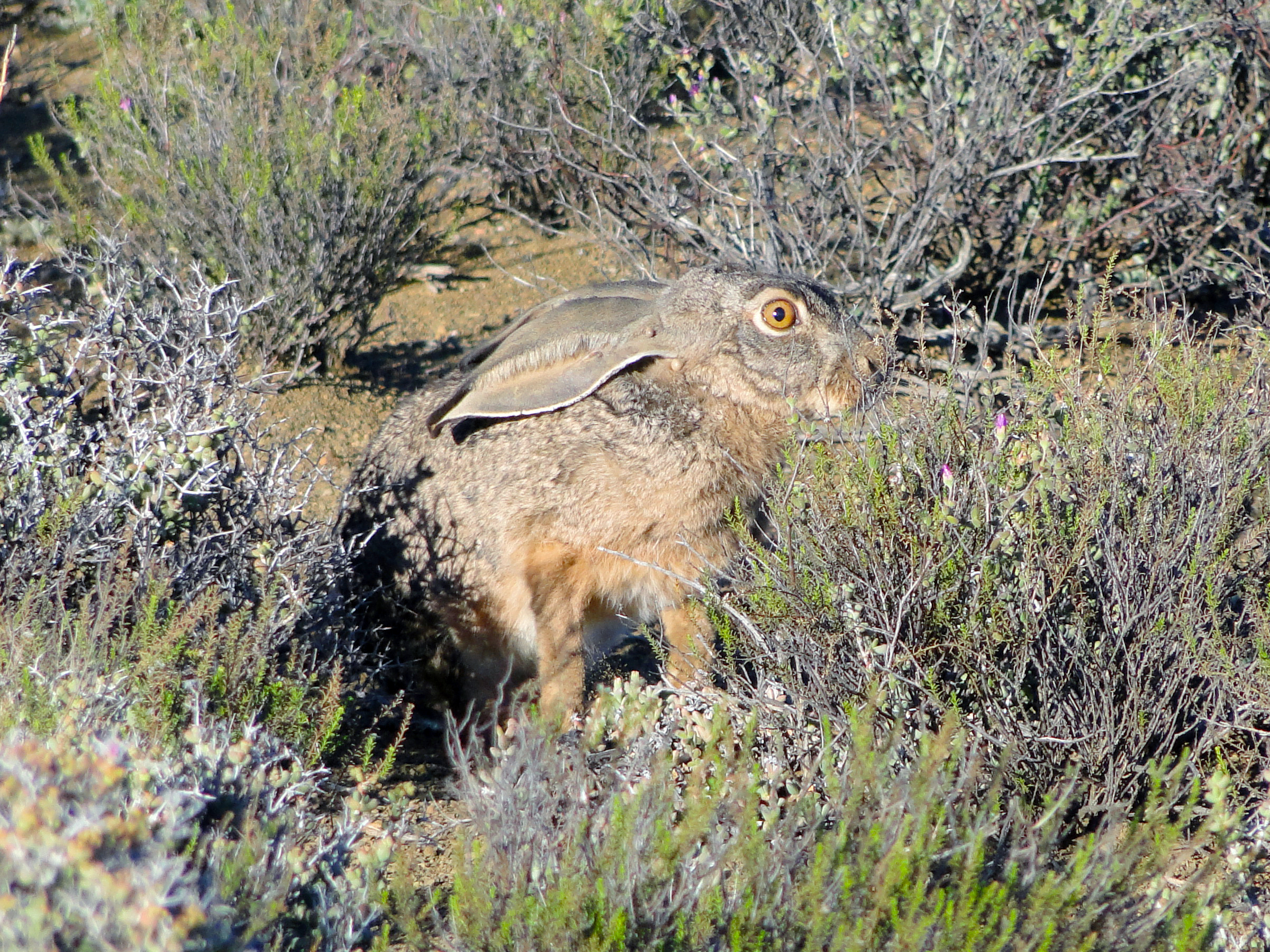
Cape hare

Order: Lagomporpha (lagomorphs)

- Family: Leporidae (rabbits, hares)
  - Genus: Lepus
    - Cape hare (lepus capensis)

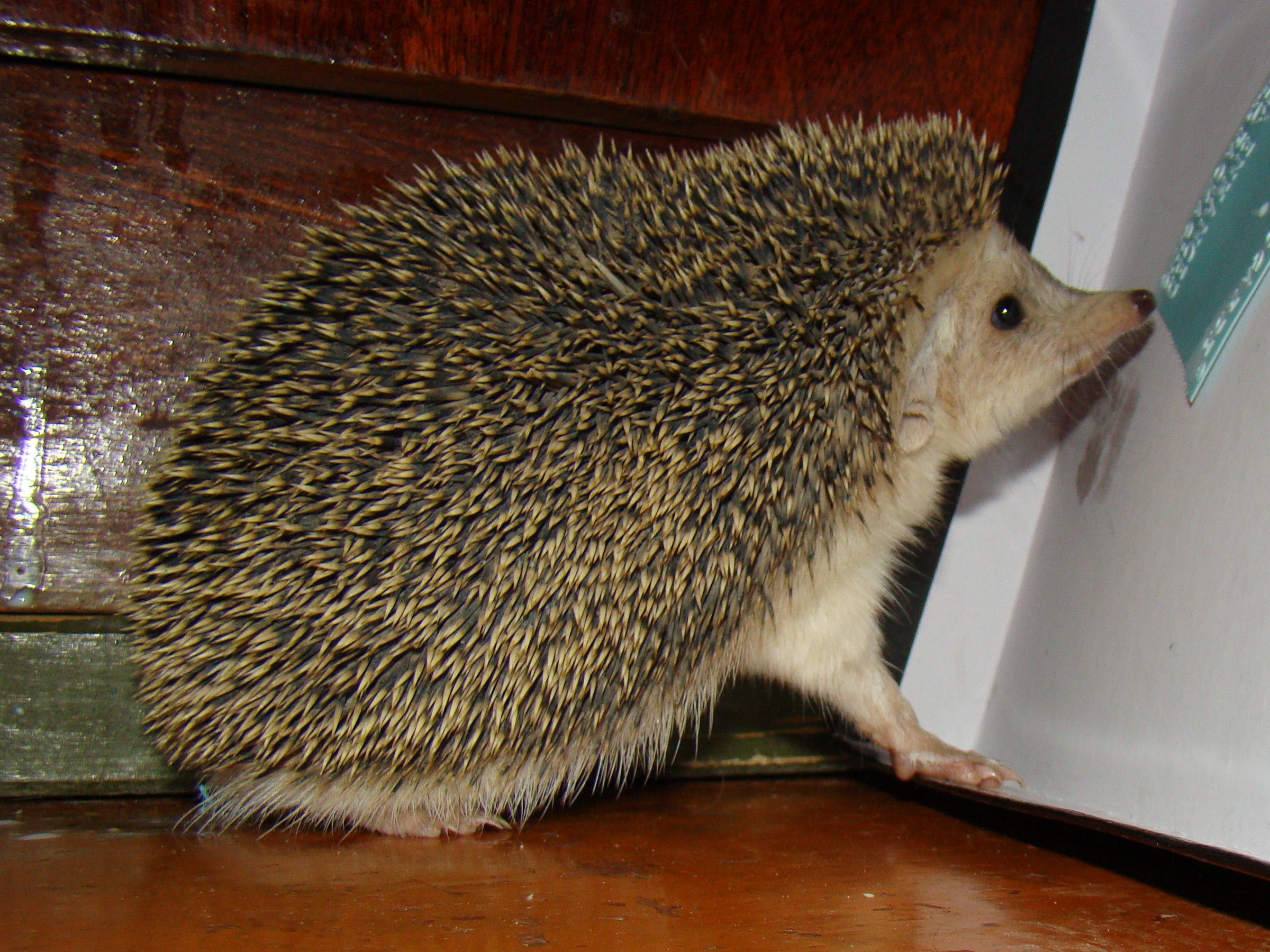
Long-eared hedgehog

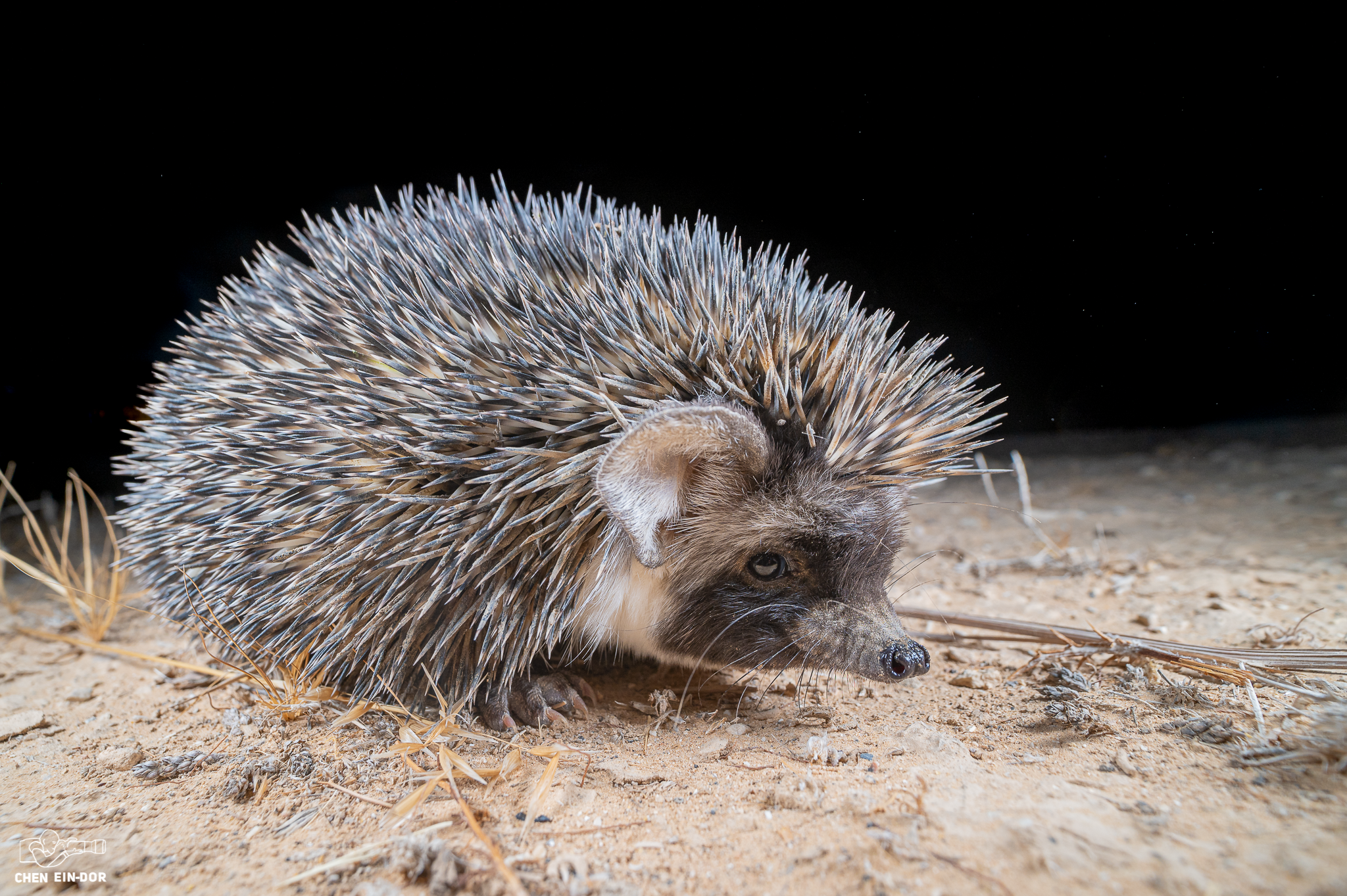
Desert hedgehog

Order: Erinaceomorpha (hedgehogs and gymnures)

- Family: Erinaceidae (hedgehogs)
  - Genus: Hemiechinus
    - Long-eared hedgehog Hemiechinus auritus
  - Genus: Paraechinus
    - Desert hedgehog Paraechinus aethiopicus

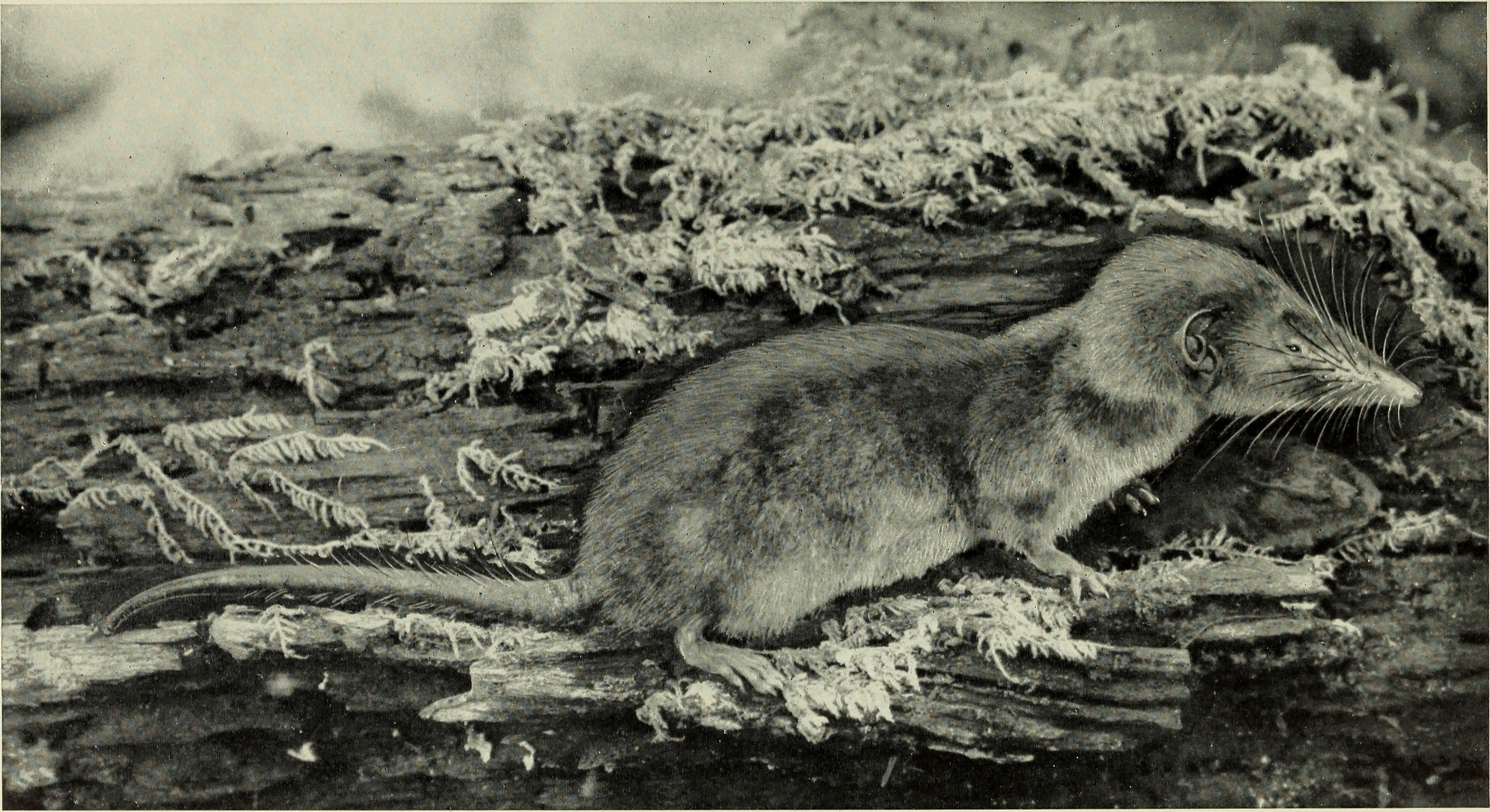
African giant shrew

Order: Soricomorpha (shrews, moles and solenodons)
