= Dunn's gerbil =

Conservation status
- Least Concern (IUCN 3.1)

Scientific classification
- Kingdom: Animalia
- Phylum: Chordata
- Class: Mammalia
- Order: Rodentia
- Family: Muridae
- Genus: Gerbillus
- Species: G. dunni

Binomial name
- Gerbillus dunni Thomas, 1904

Species of rodent

Dunn's gerbil (Gerbillus dunni) is a rodent species distributed mainly in Eritrea, Ethiopia, Somaliland and Djibouti. It is an animal of dry grassland and rocky plains. It is also sometimes called the "Somalia gerbil", not to be confused with the Somalian gerbil or the Somali gerbil.

Dunn's gerbil was first described by the British zoologist Oldfield Thomas as Gerbillus dunni in 1904. Its karyotype is 2n=74. Its natural habitat is not under threat and the International Union for Conservation of Nature has assessed its conservation status as being of "least concern".

== Description ==
Dunn's gerbil is one of eight very similar species of gerbil native to northeastern Africa, the others being Berbera gerbil (G. acticola), Brockman's gerbil (G. brockmani), cushioned gerbil (G. pulvinatus), Harwood's gerbil (G. harwoodi), least gerbil (G. pusillus), Somalian gerbil (G. somalicus), and Waters's gerbil (G. watersi). Dunn's gerbil can be distinguished from the others by the hairy soles to its hind feet. The head-and-body length is about 98 mm (3.9 in) and the tail 135 mm (5.3 in). The mass is about 38 g (1.34 oz).

== Distribution ==
Dunn's gerbil is native to the Horn of Africa. Its range includes Eritrea, Djibouti, eastern Ethiopia and northern Somalia. Its typical habitat is bare or scantily-vegetated, rocky plains, dry grassland and dry savannah.

== Status ==
Dunn's gerbil is present in a large area of suitable habitat. No particular threats have been identified and the population is believed to be steady, and although it is seldom seen, its population is presumed to be large. The International Union for Conservation of Nature has rated its conservation status as being of "least concern".
