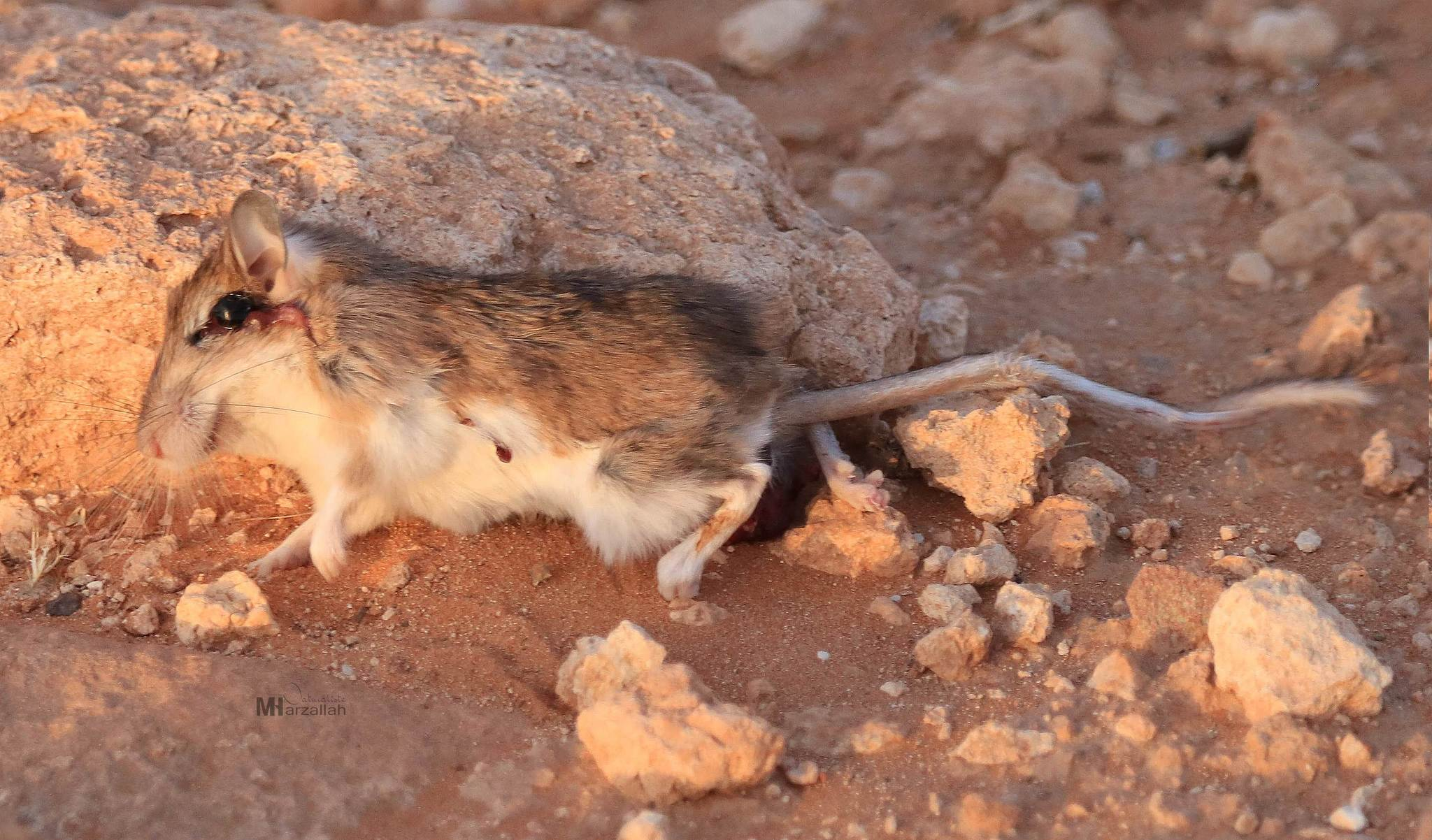

Conservation status
- Least Concern (IUCN 3.1)

Scientific classification
- Kingdom: Animalia
- Phylum: Chordata
- Class: Mammalia
- Order: Rodentia
- Family: Muridae
- Genus: Gerbillus
- Species: G. tarabuli

Binomial name
- Gerbillus tarabuli (Thomas, 1902)

Synonyms
- Gerbillus hamadensis Ranck, 1968; Gerbillus riggenbachi Thomas, 1903; Gerbillus tibesti Setzer and Ranck, 1971

= Tarabul's gerbil =

Species of rodent

Tarabul's gerbil (Gerbillus tarabuli) is a species of small rodent which is found in arid regions of north western Africa.

== Description ==
Tarabul's gerbil is a small mouse like rodent with a long tail which ends in a tuft. It has tawny fur on the dorsal surface and white fur on its ventral surface which is clearly demarcated. The ears are plain with no black tips a white spot just behind them and the soles of its feet bear hair. The sympatric occidental gerbil Gerbillus occiduus has ears with black tips and no spot behind them. The head and body length averages 102.9 mm (4.05 in) and the tail length averages 148.4 mm (5.84 in).

== Distribution ==
Tarabul's gerbil is found from northern Senegal, Mauritania, Western Sahara and Morocco east to Tibesti Mountains of Chad in the south and to Cyrenaica in eastern Libya in the north. The recently noted extension of its range into northern Senegal may be an indicator of increased desertification.

== Habitat ==
Tarabul's gerbil occurs in sandy desert and semi-desert areas, as well as coastal steppe.

== Habits ==
Tarabul's gerbil is a nocturnal species that digs complex, shallow burrows (15–25 cm in length) in the sand and which plugs the entrance to its burrow during the day. It breeds during throughout the rainy season, July to September, beginning breeding at the end of the coll dry season in April and ending at the start of the cool dry season in November. Barn owls Tyto alba have been recorded as preying on this species.

== Taxonomy ==
Tarabul's gerbil was considered to be a junior taxonomic synonym of the greater Egyptian gerbil Gerbillis pyramidus but has a different chromosome count of 40 rather than 38 and differs morphologically.
