= Monodia =

Monodia may refer to:

- the Mauritanian gerbil, a rodent species sometimes placed in a genus Monodia.
- Monodia (plant), a genus of grasses in the Chloridoideae subfamily.
- monody, a musical composition with a single melodic line or voice (Latin)
- monody (lament), Bzyantine funerary genre
- duo monodia, a Swiss musical duo (Harp and Oboe/Englishhorn)
- Monodia (album)
