= Principal gerbil =

Conservation status
- Data Deficient (IUCN 3.1)

Scientific classification
- Kingdom: Animalia
- Phylum: Chordata
- Class: Mammalia
- Order: Rodentia
- Family: Muridae
- Genus: Gerbillus
- Species: G. principulus

Binomial name
- Gerbillus principulus Thomas and Hinton, 1923

Species of rodent

The principal gerbil (Gerbillus principulus) is a species of gerbil distributed mainly in Sudan; Jebel Meidob; El Malha. Fewer than 250 individuals of this species are thought to persist in the wild.
