= Przewalski's gerbil =

Conservation status
- Least Concern (IUCN 3.1)

Scientific classification
- Kingdom: Animalia
- Phylum: Chordata
- Class: Mammalia
- Infraclass: Placentalia
- Order: Rodentia
- Family: Muridae
- Subfamily: Gerbillinae
- Tribe: Gerbillini
- Subtribe: Gerbillina
- Genus: Brachiones; Thomas, 1925
- Species: B. przewalskii

Binomial name
- Brachiones przewalskii (Büchner, 1889)

Species of rodent

Przewalski's gerbil or Przewalski's jird (Brachiones przewalskii) is a species of rodent in the family Muridae. It is the only species in the genus Brachiones, and is found only in China.
