= Darfur gerbil =

Conservation status
- Data Deficient (IUCN 3.1)

Scientific classification
- Kingdom: Animalia
- Phylum: Chordata
- Class: Mammalia
- Order: Rodentia
- Family: Muridae
- Genus: Gerbillus
- Species: G. muriculus

Binomial name
- Gerbillus muriculus Thomas & Hinton, 1923

Species of rodent

The Darfur gerbil (Gerbillus muriculus) is distributed mainly in western Sudan.
