= Harrison's gerbil =

Conservation status
- Least Concern (IUCN 3.1)

Scientific classification
- Kingdom: Animalia
- Phylum: Chordata
- Class: Mammalia
- Order: Rodentia
- Family: Muridae
- Genus: Gerbillus
- Species: G. mesopotamiae

Binomial name
- Gerbillus mesopotamiae Harrison, 1956

Species of rodent

Harrison's gerbil (Gerbillus mesopotamiae) is a gerbil, a small mammal in the rodent order. It is distributed mainly in the Tigris-Euphrates Valley in Iraq and western Iran. It is also known as the Mesopotamian gerbil.
