= Algerian gerbil =

Scientific classification
- Kingdom: Animalia
- Phylum: Chordata
- Class: Mammalia
- Infraclass: Placentalia
- Order: Rodentia
- Family: Muridae
- Genus: Gerbillus
- Species: G. garamantis

Binomial name
- Gerbillus garamantis Lataste, 1881

Species of rodent

The Algerian gerbil (Gerbillus garamantis) is a species of rodent distributed mainly in Algeria. It is sometimes considered a subspecies of the dwarf gerbil.
