= Somalian gerbil =

Conservation status
- Data Deficient (IUCN 3.1)

Scientific classification
- Kingdom: Animalia
- Phylum: Chordata
- Class: Mammalia
- Order: Rodentia
- Family: Muridae
- Genus: Gerbillus
- Species: G. somalicus

Binomial name
- Gerbillus somalicus (Thomas, 1910)

Synonyms
- Dipodillus somalicus (Thomas, 1910)

Species of rodent

The Somalian gerbil (Gerbillus somalicus) is a species of rodent in the subfamily Gerbillinae. It is known only from Djibouti and Somalia.
