= Sand gerbil =

Conservation status
- Data Deficient (IUCN 3.1)

Scientific classification
- Domain: Eukaryota
- Kingdom: Animalia
- Phylum: Chordata
- Class: Mammalia
- Order: Rodentia
- Family: Muridae
- Genus: Gerbillus
- Species: G. syrticus

Binomial name
- Gerbillus syrticus (Misonne, 1974)

Species of rodent

The sand gerbil (Gerbillus syrticus) is distributed mainly in northeastern Libya. Less than 250 individuals are thought to be left in existence. It is sometimes considered a subspecies of the pygmy gerbil.
