= Berbera gerbil =

Conservation status
- Data Deficient (IUCN 3.1)

Scientific classification
- Kingdom: Animalia
- Phylum: Chordata
- Class: Mammalia
- Order: Rodentia
- Family: Muridae
- Genus: Gerbillus
- Species: G. acticola

Binomial name
- Gerbillus acticola Thomas, 1918

Species of rodent

The Berbera gerbil (Gerbillus acticola) is a species of rodent in the subfamily Gerbillinae. It is endemic to Somaliland.

== Description ==
The Berbera gerbil has an average head-and-body length of 94 mm (3.7 in) and a tail of 129 mm (5.1 in). It is a small gerbil, the upper pars being sandy orange, the individual hairs having grey shafts and orange tips. The flanks are rather paler, the hairs being white with orange tips, and the underparts are pure white, with a clear demarcation line between the dorsal and ventral pelage. There is a white patch round the eye and the cheeks, chin, throat and feet are white. The soles of the feet are hairless. The long tail is sandy orange above and pale below, and has a narrow tuft of brown and white hairs at its tip. It is generally similar in size and appearance to the greater Egyptian gerbil (Gerbillus pyramidum), but they have different geographical ranges.

== Distribution and habitat ==
The Berbera gerbil is endemic to the Horn of Africa. It is known from three locations in Somaliland, at Berbera, where the type specimen was found, Bulhar and Burao. Two of these locations were in the lowlands but the location near Burao was at 1,000 m (3,280 ft). The precise habitat is not known, but collectors used such descriptions as "caught on sandy plain" and "caught by well".

== Status ==
The Berbera gerbil is a little known species. Only a few individuals have been collected and its range is not clearly delineated. With little information as to its occurrence, status, ecological requirements and the threats it faces, the International Union for Conservation of Nature has rated its conservation status as being "data deficient".
