= Sudan gerbil =

Conservation status
- Data Deficient (IUCN 3.1)

Scientific classification
- Kingdom: Animalia
- Phylum: Chordata
- Class: Mammalia
- Order: Rodentia
- Family: Muridae
- Genus: Gerbillus
- Species: G. nancillus

Binomial name
- Gerbillus nancillus Thomas & Hinton, 1923

Species of rodent

The Sudan gerbil (Gerbillus nancillus) is distributed mainly in central Sudan.
