= Black-tufted gerbil =

Conservation status
- Least Concern (IUCN 3.1)

Scientific classification
- Kingdom: Animalia
- Phylum: Chordata
- Class: Mammalia
- Order: Rodentia
- Family: Muridae
- Genus: Gerbillus
- Species: G. famulus

Binomial name
- Gerbillus famulus Yerbury & Thomas, 1895

Species of rodent

The black-tufted gerbil (Gerbillus famulus) is distributed mainly across the southwestern Arabian Peninsula.
