= Ammodile =

Conservation status
- Data Deficient (IUCN 3.1)

Scientific classification
- Kingdom: Animalia
- Phylum: Chordata
- Class: Mammalia
- Order: Rodentia
- Family: Muridae
- Subfamily: Gerbillinae
- Tribe: Ammodillini; Pavlinov, 1981
- Genus: Ammodillus; Thomas, 1904
- Species: A. imbellis

Binomial name
- Ammodillus imbellis (de Winton, 1898)

Genus of rodents

The ammodile, walo or Somali gerbil (Ammodillus imbellis) is a species of rodent in the family Muridae. It is the only species in the genus Ammodillus. It is found in Ethiopia and Somalia. Its natural habitat is subtropical or tropical dry lowland grassland. It is threatened by habitat loss.
