= Western gerbil =

Conservation status
- Endangered (IUCN 3.1)

Scientific classification
- Kingdom: Animalia
- Phylum: Chordata
- Class: Mammalia
- Order: Rodentia
- Family: Muridae
- Genus: Gerbillus
- Species: G. hesperinus

Binomial name
- Gerbillus hesperinus Cabrera, 1936

Species of rodent

The western gerbil (Gerbillus hesperinus) is distributed mainly in northern Morocco. It is listed as Endangered by the IUCN.
