= Lataste's gerbil =

Conservation status
- Data Deficient (IUCN 3.1)

Scientific classification
- Kingdom: Animalia
- Phylum: Chordata
- Class: Mammalia
- Order: Rodentia
- Family: Muridae
- Genus: Gerbillus
- Species: G. latastei

Binomial name
- Gerbillus latastei Thomas and Troussart, 1903

Species of rodent

Lataste's gerbil (Gerbillus latastei) is distributed mainly in Tunisia, Libya, and possibly Algeria. It is also known as the hairy-footed gerbil.
