= Cushioned gerbil =

Conservation status
- Least Concern (IUCN 3.1)

Scientific classification
- Kingdom: Animalia
- Phylum: Chordata
- Class: Mammalia
- Order: Rodentia
- Family: Muridae
- Genus: Gerbillus
- Species: G. pulvinatus

Binomial name
- Gerbillus pulvinatus Rhoads, 1896

Synonyms
- Gerbillus bilensis Frick, 1914

Species of rodent

The cushioned gerbil (Gerbillus pulvinatus) is a species of rodent in the subfamily Gerbillinae. It is native to Djibouti, Ethiopia, and Kenya, though it may also occur in south-east Sudan.
