= Brockman's gerbil =

Conservation status
- Data Deficient (IUCN 3.1)

Scientific classification
- Kingdom: Animalia
- Phylum: Chordata
- Class: Mammalia
- Infraclass: Placentalia
- Order: Rodentia
- Family: Muridae
- Genus: Gerbillus
- Species: G. brockmani

Binomial name
- Gerbillus brockmani (Thomas, 1910)

Synonyms
- Dipodillus brockmani Thomas, 1910

Species of rodent

Brockman's gerbil (Gerbillus brockmani) is a species of rodent in the subfamily Gerbillinae. Endemic to Somaliland, it is known only from the type locality, Burao in central Somaliland.
