= Grobben's gerbil =

Conservation status
- Data Deficient (IUCN 3.1)

Scientific classification
- Kingdom: Animalia
- Phylum: Chordata
- Class: Mammalia
- Order: Rodentia
- Family: Muridae
- Genus: Gerbillus
- Species: G. grobbeni

Binomial name
- Gerbillus grobbeni Klaptocz, 1909

Species of rodent

Grobben's gerbil (Gerbillus grobbeni) is a species of rodent, distributed mainly in Libya; Cyrenaica, Dernah. Less than 250 individuals of this species are thought to persist in the wild. It is named after Austrian biologist Karl Grobben.
