= Swarthy gerbil =

Conservation status
- Least Concern (IUCN 3.1)

Scientific classification
- Kingdom: Animalia
- Phylum: Chordata
- Class: Mammalia
- Order: Rodentia
- Family: Muridae
- Genus: Gerbillus
- Species: G. aquilus

Binomial name
- Gerbillus aquilus Schlitter and Setzer, 1972

Species of rodent

The swarthy gerbil (Gerbillus aquilus) is distributed mainly in eastern Iran, southern Afghanistan, and western Pakistan.
