= Mauritanian gerbil =

Conservation status
- Data Deficient (IUCN 3.1)

Scientific classification
- Domain: Eukaryota
- Kingdom: Animalia
- Phylum: Chordata
- Class: Mammalia
- Order: Rodentia
- Family: Muridae
- Genus: Gerbillus
- Species: G. mauritaniae

Binomial name
- Gerbillus mauritaniae Heim de Balsac, 1943

Species of rodent

The Mauritanian gerbil (Gerbillus mauritaniae) is distributed mainly in northern Mauritania. Some authorities place it in a separate genus, Monodia. It is also sometimes considered a subspecies of the Sudan gerbil.
