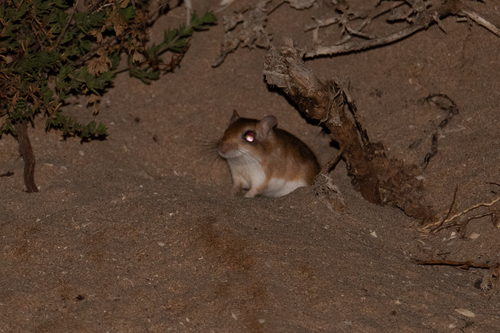

Conservation status
- Vulnerable (IUCN 3.1)

Scientific classification
- Kingdom: Animalia
- Phylum: Chordata
- Class: Mammalia
- Order: Rodentia
- Family: Muridae
- Genus: Gerbillus
- Species: G. hoogstraali

Binomial name
- Gerbillus hoogstraali (Lay, 1975)

= Hoogstraal's gerbil =

Species of rodent

Hoogstraal's gerbil (Gerbillus hoogstraali) is distributed mainly in southwestern Morocco. There are thought to be less than 250 individuals in existence.

The specific epithet honors American entomologist and parasitologist Harry Hoogstraal.
