= Agag gerbil =

Conservation status
- Data Deficient (IUCN 3.1)

Scientific classification
- Kingdom: Animalia
- Phylum: Chordata
- Class: Mammalia
- Order: Rodentia
- Family: Muridae
- Genus: Gerbillus
- Species: G. agag

Binomial name
- Gerbillus agag Thomas, 1903

Species of rodent

The Agag gerbil (Gerbillus agag) is distributed mainly in southern Mauritania to northern Nigeria and Sudan.
