= Rosalinda gerbil =

Conservation status
- Least Concern (IUCN 3.1)

Scientific classification
- Kingdom: Animalia
- Phylum: Chordata
- Class: Mammalia
- Order: Rodentia
- Family: Muridae
- Genus: Gerbillus
- Species: G. rosalinda

Binomial name
- Gerbillus rosalinda St. Leger, 1929

Species of rodent

The Rosalinda gerbil (Gerbillus rosalinda) is distributed mainly central Sudan.
