= Indian hairy-footed gerbil =

Conservation status
- Least Concern (IUCN 3.1)

Scientific classification
- Kingdom: Animalia
- Phylum: Chordata
- Class: Mammalia
- Order: Rodentia
- Family: Muridae
- Genus: Gerbillus
- Species: G. gleadowi

Binomial name
- Gerbillus gleadowi (Murray, 1886)

Species of rodent

The Indian hairy-footed gerbil (Gerbillus gleadowi) is a species of rodent found mainly in Pakistan and northwestern India.

They inhabit dry, sandy, and rocky country with sparse vegetation. Their burrows are often closed with sand. They feed nocturnally on seeds, roots, nuts, grasses and insects.

They breed throughout the year. Their gestation period is 20–22 days, with litters of four or five naked pups, on average. The young open their eyes at 16–20 days, and they are weaned by their parents after a month.
