= Least gerbil =

Conservation status
- Least Concern (IUCN 3.1)

Scientific classification
- Kingdom: Animalia
- Phylum: Chordata
- Class: Mammalia
- Order: Rodentia
- Family: Muridae
- Genus: Gerbillus
- Species: G. pusillus

Binomial name
- Gerbillus pusillus Peters, 1878

Synonyms
- Gerbillus ruberrimus Rhoads, 1896; Gerbillus diminutus (Dollman, 1911); Gerbillus percivali (Dollman, 1914)

Species of rodent

The least gerbil (Gerbillus pusillus) is a species of rodent in the subfamily Gerbillinae. It is native to Ethiopia, Kenya, Somalia, South Sudan, and Tanzania.
