= Large Aden gerbil =

Conservation status
- Least Concern (IUCN 3.1)

Scientific classification
- Kingdom: Animalia
- Phylum: Chordata
- Class: Mammalia
- Order: Rodentia
- Family: Muridae
- Genus: Gerbillus
- Species: G. poecilops

Binomial name
- Gerbillus poecilops Yerbury & Thomas, 1895

Species of rodent

The large Aden gerbil (Gerbillus poecilops) is a species of rodent in the family Muridae. It is found in Saudi Arabia and Yemen.
