= Occidental gerbil =

Conservation status
- Data Deficient (IUCN 3.1)

Scientific classification
- Kingdom: Animalia
- Phylum: Chordata
- Class: Mammalia
- Order: Rodentia
- Family: Muridae
- Genus: Gerbillus
- Species: G. occiduus

Binomial name
- Gerbillus occiduus Lay, 1975

Species of rodent

The occidental gerbil (Gerbillus occiduus) is distributed mainly southwestern Morocco. Less than 250 individuals of this species are thought to persist in the wild.
