= Flower's gerbil =

Conservation status
- Least Concern (IUCN 3.1)

Scientific classification
- Kingdom: Animalia
- Phylum: Chordata
- Class: Mammalia
- Order: Rodentia
- Family: Muridae
- Genus: Gerbillus
- Species: G. floweri

Binomial name
- Gerbillus floweri (Thomas, 1919)

Species of rodent

Flower's gerbil (Gerbillus floweri) is a large gerbil distributed mainly in Egypt, from the eastern fringes of the Nile Delta to the Sinai Peninsula, south of El Arish. Less than 250 individuals of this species are thought to persist in the wild, but it is not considered to be at threat, since it is common within its area of habitat (18.22 km2) and nothing poses a direct threat to it. This species is found in rocky desert, sandy coastal plains, grass valleys, palm tree groves and cultivated areas.

The fur on the upper parts of the gerbil's body varies in color from pale cinnamon to tawny with an inconspicuous dorsal stripe. It has long ears which are unpigmented. The hind feet have hairy soles. It is usually between 111–213 mm in body length with the tail, usually longer than the body (140–158 mm). It weighs approximately 49–63 gm.

The Flower's gerbil is nocturnal and lives in burrows. It feeds on insects and plants. The breeding season of Flower's gerbil is known to be from May to December. A female's litter usually contains four young after a gestation period of 20 to 22 days. The young are born with closed eyes and are hairless. except for some bristles on snout. They begin to walk after 8 days, open their eyes after 19–20 days and reach sexual maturity after 3 months.
