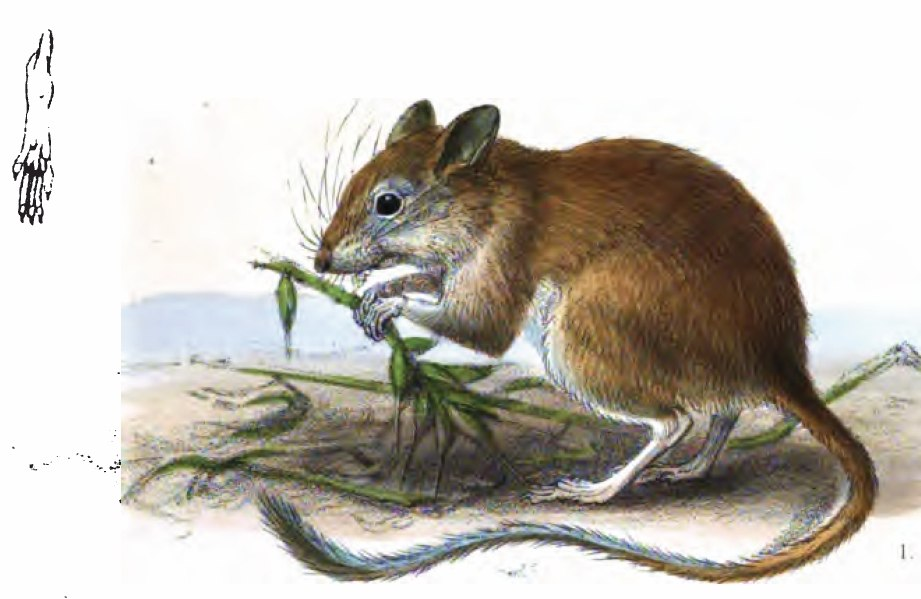

Conservation status
- Least Concern (IUCN 3.1)

Scientific classification
- Kingdom: Animalia
- Phylum: Chordata
- Class: Mammalia
- Order: Rodentia
- Family: Muridae
- Genus: Gerbillus
- Species: G. nanus

Binomial name
- Gerbillus nanus Blanford, 1875

Synonyms
- Gerbillus quadrimaculatus; Gerbillus vivax (partim)

= Balochistan gerbil =

Species of rodent

The Balochistan gerbil or dwarf gerbil (Gerbillus nanus), is distributed mainly from Morocco across north Africa, the Arabian Peninsula, the Middle East, and western Asia. This is a common species with a wide distribution which faces no obvious threats, so the International Union for Conservation of Nature has rated its conservation status as being of "least concern".

== Description ==
The Balochistan gerbil is a medium-sized, slender species that somewhat resembles Wagner's gerbil (Dipodillus dasyurus). Its head-and-body length is between 140 and 235 mm (5.5 and 9.3 in) and its tail is between 80 and 145 mm (3.1 and 5.7 in). The upper parts are yellowish-brown, tinged with grey; this is because the individual hairs have grey bases. The flanks are less grey. The underparts and inside of the limbs are white, and there is a sharp line delineating the boundary between upper and lower parts. There are separate white patches above the eye and behind the ear, and a large white patch on the rump. The upper side of the tail is yellowish-brown near the base becoming greyer near the tip. The underside is white and the tip of the tail bears a boss of longer hairs, which are variable in colour, but usually grey.

== Distribution and habitat ==
The Balochistan gerbil has a very wide distribution across northern Africa, the Arabian peninsula and western Asia. Its range includes the northwestern region of Africa to the north of the Sahara, from Morocco, Algeria, and Tunisia, and the Sahel to the south of the desert, from Mauritania to Mali, Niger and Chad. A separate population is present in the Arabian Peninsula, the Middle East, Afghanistan, Pakistan, and northwestern India. The typical habitat of this gerbil is desert and semi-desert where it mostly occupies better vegetated locations such as wadi's, oases, and sand-clay basins and plains with relatively deep soils.
