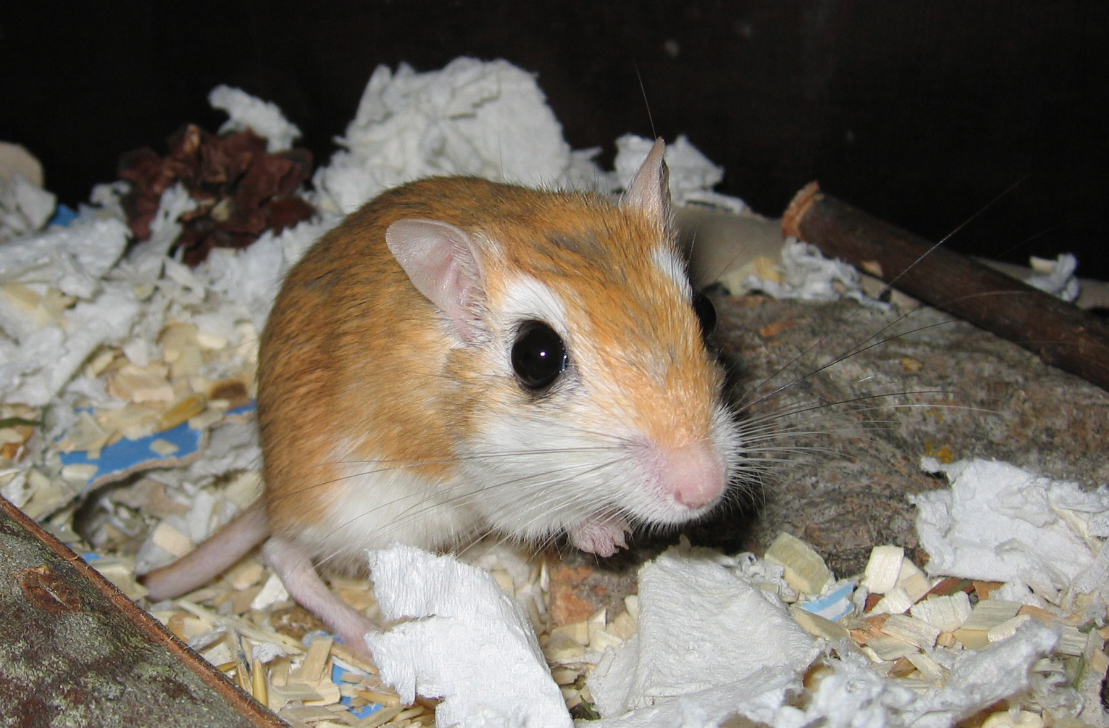

Conservation status
- Least Concern (IUCN 3.1)

Scientific classification
- Kingdom: Animalia
- Phylum: Chordata
- Class: Mammalia
- Order: Rodentia
- Family: Muridae
- Genus: Gerbillus
- Species: G. perpallidus

Binomial name
- Gerbillus perpallidus Setzer, 1958

= Pale gerbil =

Species of rodent

The pale gerbil (Gerbillus perpallidus) is endemic to Egypt and is distributed mainly in the northwestern part of the country. It is also known as the pallid gerbil. The pale gerbil has pale orange fur, with white underparts, white forelimbs and white feet. The ears are unpigmented and the soles of the feet are haired, which is a characteristic of sand-dwelling gerbils.

It averages 22 to 27 cm in length, and weights 26 to 49 g.

== As pets ==
The pale or pallid gerbil, usually shortened to pallid by enthusiasts, is recommended as a good second species for those with experience of keeping Mongolian jirds (gerbils).
