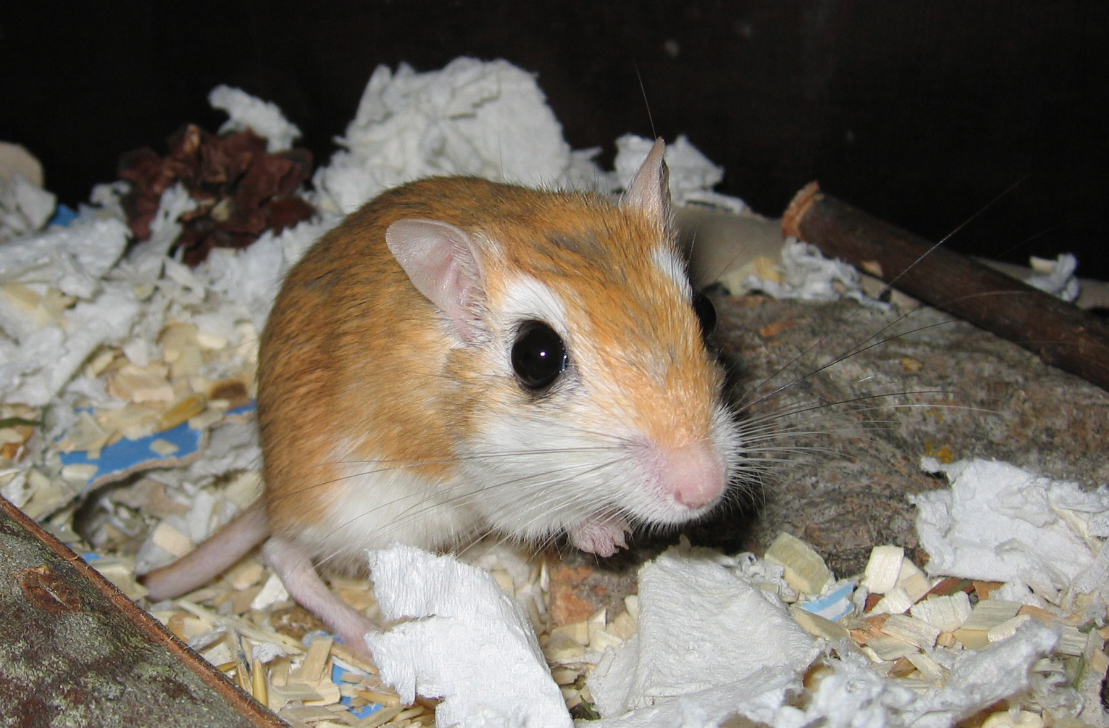
- Pale gerbil (Gerbillus perpallidus)

Scientific classification
- Kingdom: Animalia
- Phylum: Chordata
- Class: Mammalia
- Infraclass: Placentalia
- Order: Rodentia
- Family: Muridae
- Subfamily: Gerbillinae
- Tribe: Gerbillini
- Subtribe: Gerbillina
- Genus: Gerbillus; Desmarest, 1804

Type species
- Gerbillus aegyptius

Subgenera
- Hendecapleura; Gerbillus

= Gerbillus =

Gerbillus Temporal range: Pliocene–Recent

Genus of rodents

Gerbillus is a genus that contains most common and the most diverse gerbils. In 2010, after morphological and molecular studies Dipodillus was ranged as a subgenus of Gerbillus, however some taxonomic authorities continue to separate them.

== Species ==
Genus Gerbillus

- Subgenus Hendecapleura
  - Pleasant gerbil, Gerbillus amoenus
  - Brockman's gerbil, Gerbillus brockmani
  - Black-tufted gerbil, Gerbillus famulus
  - Algerian gerbil, Gerbillus garamantis
  - Grobben's gerbil, Gerbillus grobbeni
  - Pygmy gerbil, Gerbillus henleyi
  - Mauritanian gerbil, Gerbillus mauritaniae (sometimes considered a separate genus Monodia)
  - Harrison's gerbil, Gerbillus mesopotamiae
  - Darfur gerbil, Gerbillus muriculus
  - Balochistan gerbil, Gerbillus nanus
  - Large Aden gerbil, Gerbillus poecilops
  - Principal gerbil, Gerbillus principulus
  - Least gerbil, Gerbillus pusillus
  - Sand gerbil, Gerbillus syrticus
  - Waters's gerbil, Gerbillus watersi
- Subgenus Gerbillus
  - Berbera gerbil, Gerbillus acticola
  - Agag gerbil, Gerbillus agag
  - Anderson's gerbil, Gerbillus andersoni
  - Swarthy gerbil, Gerbillus aquilus
  - Burton's gerbil, Gerbillus burtoni
  - Cheesman's gerbil, Gerbillus cheesmani
  - Dongola gerbil, Gerbillus dongolanus
  - Somalia gerbil, Gerbillus dunni
  - Flower's gerbil, Gerbillus floweri
  - Lesser Egyptian gerbil, Gerbillus gerbillus
  - Indian hairy-footed gerbil, Gerbillus gleadowi
  - Western gerbil, Gerbillus hesperinus
  - Hoogstraal's gerbil, Gerbillus hoogstraali
  - Lataste's gerbil, Gerbillus latastei
  - Sudan gerbil, Gerbillus nancillus
  - Nigerian gerbil, Gerbillus nigeriae
  - Occidental gerbil, Gerbillus occiduus
  - Pale gerbil, Gerbillus perpallidus
  - Cushioned gerbil, Gerbillus pulvinatus
  - Greater Egyptian gerbil, Gerbillus pyramidum
  - Rosalinda gerbil, Gerbillus rosalinda
  - Tarabul's gerbil, Gerbillus tarabuli
