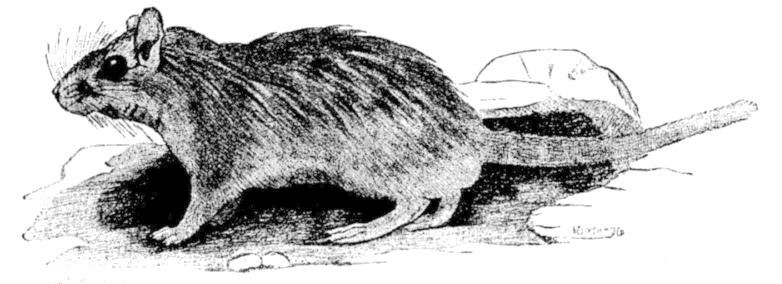

Conservation status
- Least Concern (IUCN 3.1)

Scientific classification
- Kingdom: Animalia
- Phylum: Chordata
- Class: Mammalia
- Order: Rodentia
- Family: Muridae
- Genus: Gerbillus
- Species: G. gerbillus

Binomial name
- Gerbillus gerbillus (Olivier, 1801)
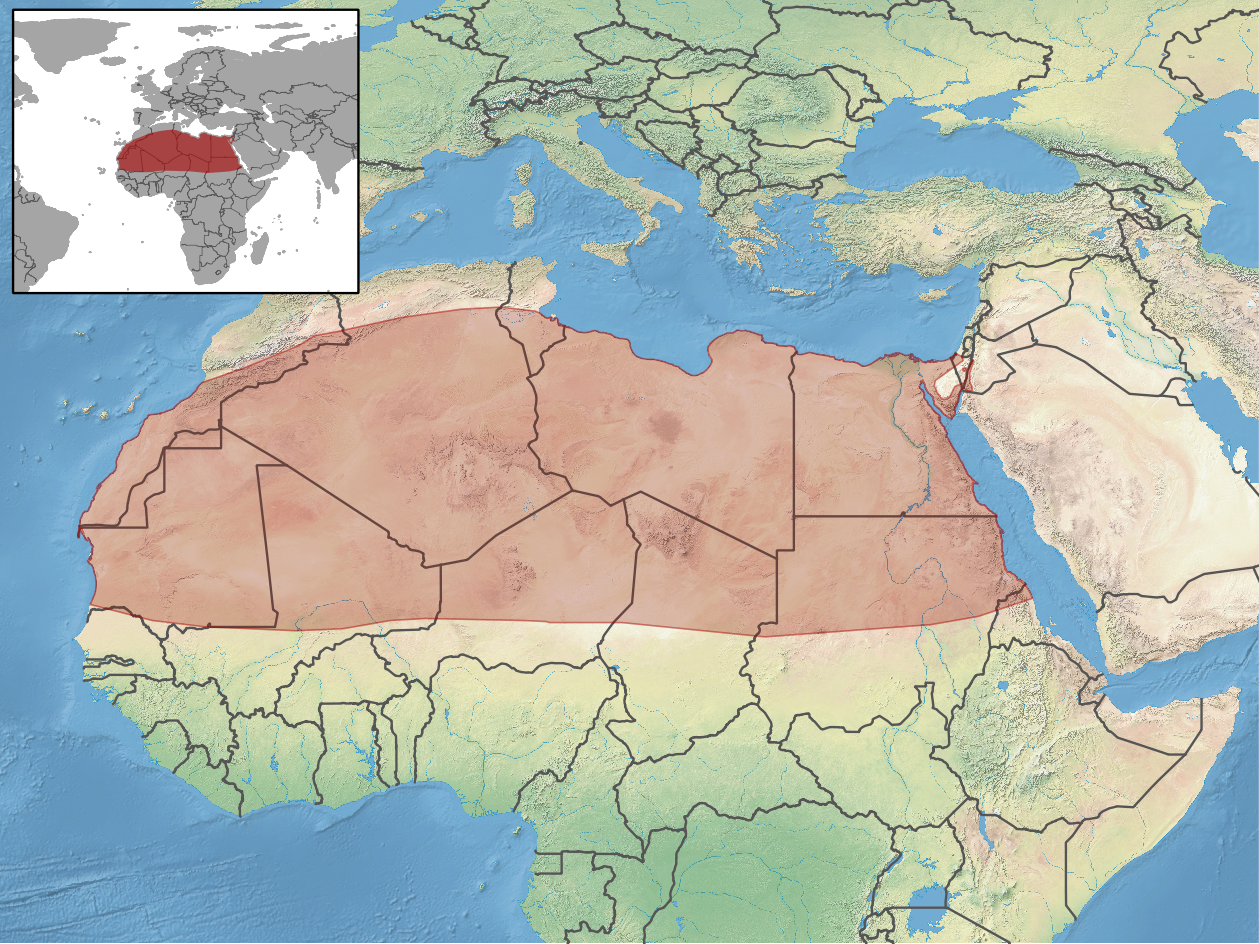

= Lesser Egyptian gerbil =

Species of rodent

The lesser Egyptian gerbil (Gerbillus gerbillus) is a small species of rodent in the family Muridae. It is native to North Africa and the Sinai Peninsula, where it lives in sandy habitats. It is a common species, and the International Union for Conservation of Nature has rated its conservation status as being of "least concern".

== Description ==
This is a small gerbil growing to a head-and-body length of about 88 mm (3.5 in) with a tail of about 117 mm (4.6 in). The dorsal fur is soft and sleek and a sandy colour, each hair having a grey base and orangish shaft, and a dark tip in some individuals. The ears are large and densely furred and there are white rings around the large eyes and small white patches behind the ears. The flanks are paler than the back, with a white central part to the individual hairs. There is a white patch on the rump just above the tail, and the underparts are white and sharply delineated from the flanks. The feet are long and covered with white hairs of variable length. The tail is sandy above and white below, usually with a terminal white or grey tuft of hairs. 2n = 42.

== Distribution and habitat ==
The lesser Egyptian gerbil is native to most of North Africa, its range extending from Morocco and Mauritania to Egypt, the Sinai Peninsula and southern Israel, and southward to northern Mali, northern Niger, northern Chad and Sudan. It prefers sandy locations and is found among dunes, in dune slacks with sparse vegetation, and in areas of wind-blown sand in wadis, palm groves and oases. They are seldom found in coastal habitats or in the middle of large dune fields, but are attracted to transient settlements and camel dung.

== Ecology ==
This gerbil digs a complex burrow which can be 4.5 m (15 ft) in length and up to 60 cm (2 ft) deep; this has branching passages and chambers for storing food and nesting materials. The humidity inside the burrow is high even when it is very low outside. This species is gregarious, and a number of individuals may share a burrow. These gerbils often live in close vicinity to the Anderson's gerbil, the Sundevall's jird, the greater Egyptian gerbil and the lesser Egyptian jerboa.

The lesser Egyptian gerbil is nocturnal. Its diet includes seeds and fruits, sometimes supplemented by buds and leaves, and by insects in the spring. It consumes fallen dates and investigates camel dung in order to feed on any seeds it may find. It sometimes enters homes to search for food. It is active throughout the year, with breeding activity being related to the temperature and day length, and fecundity to food availability. Litters vary in size, with three to six young being normal, and population sizes vary considerably. Predators include the pale fox, the barn owl, and the sand viper. This gerbil shows a homing ability, with 50% of individuals displaced from their burrow by 1,000 m (3,300 ft) being able to find their way home, and 20% displaced by 2,000 m (6,600 ft).

== Status ==
This gerbil has a very wide range across North Africa. It is a common species with the population size varying from year to year but in the long term appearing to be stable. No particular threats have been identified, and the International Union for Conservation of Nature has rated its conservation status as being of "least concern".
