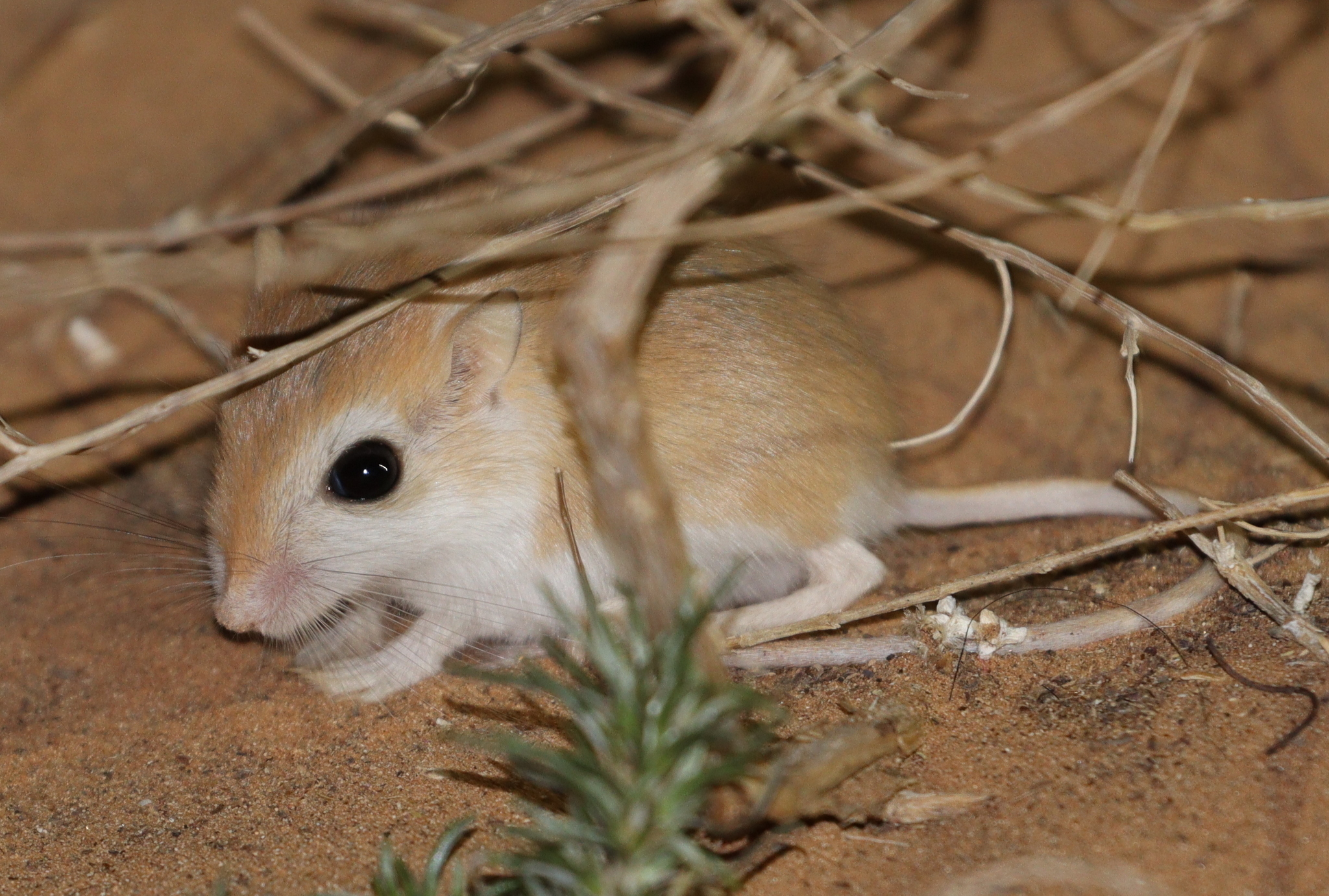

Conservation status
- Least Concern (IUCN 3.1)

Scientific classification
- Kingdom: Animalia
- Phylum: Chordata
- Class: Mammalia
- Infraclass: Placentalia
- Order: Rodentia
- Family: Muridae
- Genus: Gerbillus
- Species: G. henleyi

Binomial name
- Gerbillus henleyi de Winton, 1903

= Pygmy gerbil =

Species of rodent

The pygmy gerbil (Gerbillus henleyi) is distributed mainly in Algeria to Israel and the Arabian Peninsula. It is also known as Henley's gerbil or pygmy dipodil. Gerbillus henleyi is a long-tailed small gerbil with a back coat that is dark grey-brown which has specific white spots, and the species has small upper molars. Gerbillus henleyi, like other species of the genus Gerbillus, forage nocturnally and have mainly a plant based diet, and also depend on those dietary items for energy and water.
