= Martin Hinton =

British zoologist

- Born: Martin Alister Campbell Hinton; 29 June 1883
- Died: 3 October 1961 (aged 78)
- Known for: Work on Piltdown Man
- Awards: Fellow of the Royal Society
- Scientific career
- Institutions: Natural History Museum, London

Martin Alister Campbell Hinton FRS (29 June 1883 – 3 October 1961) was a British zoologist.

== Career ==
Hinton joined the staff of the Natural History Museum in 1910, working on mammals, in particular rodents. He became Deputy Keeper of Zoology in 1927 and Keeper in 1936, retiring in 1945.

Hinton is among those associated with the Piltdown Man hoax, a composite of an altered human skull and ape jawbone planted, and subsequently 'discovered', at a dig in Piltdown, England, and presented as a missing link between man and ape. A trunk belonging to Hinton left in storage at the Natural History Museum and found in 1970 contained animal bones and teeth carved and stained in a manner similar to the Piltdown finds, and raising questions about Hinton's involvement in the deception.
