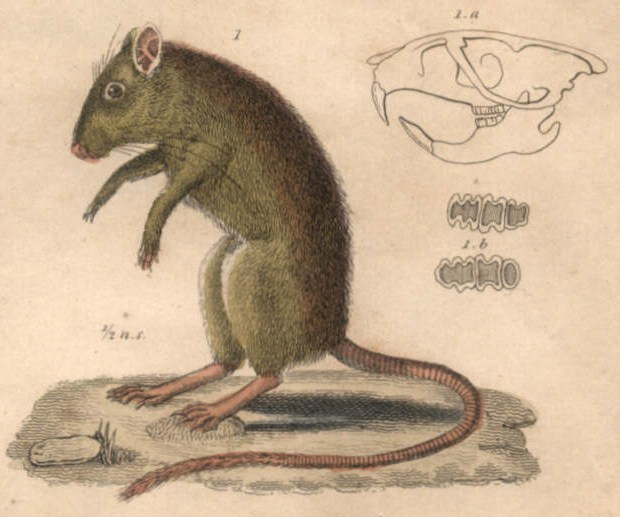

Conservation status
- Least Concern (IUCN 3.1)

Scientific classification
- Kingdom: Animalia
- Phylum: Chordata
- Class: Mammalia
- Order: Rodentia
- Family: Muridae
- Genus: Gerbillus
- Species: G. pyramidum

Binomial name
- Gerbillus pyramidum Geoffroy, 1825

Synonyms
- Gerbillus dongolanus (Dongola gerbil)

= Greater Egyptian gerbil =

Species of rodent

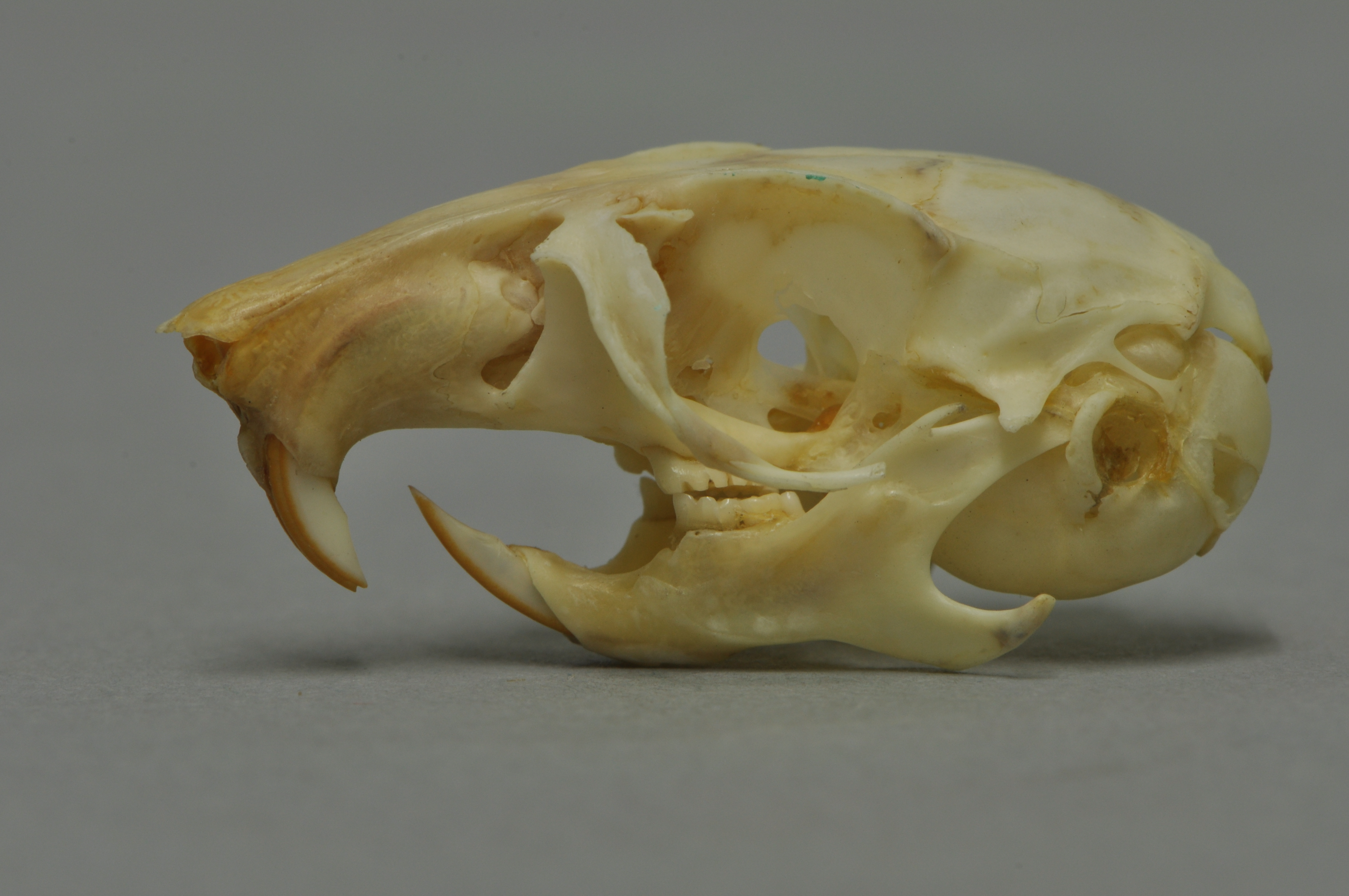
Skull of a greater Egyptian gerbil

The greater Egyptian gerbil (Gerbillus pyramidum) is a small rodent in the family Muridae. It is native to northern Africa where it inhabits sandy deserts, semi-arid areas and oases. It is a common species, and the International Union for Conservation of Nature has rated its conservation status as being of "least concern".

== Description ==
The greater Egyptian gerbil has a head-and-body length of about 120 mm (5 in) and a tail of about 156 mm (6 in). The dorsal fur is some shade of orange or light brown, the individual hairs having grey bases and orange or brown shafts. There is often a mid-dorsal dark streak. The underparts are white, as are some facial markings around the eyes and ears, and a variably-sized patch on the rump. The feet are white, with the soles of the hind feet being clad with hair. The tail is often tipped with a dark tuft of hairs. Karyotype: 2n = 38.

== Distribution and habitat ==
The greater Egyptian gerbil is native to much of North Africa. Its range extends from Mauritania and Mali eastwards through Niger and Chad to Sudan, Egypt and the Sinai Peninsula. It typically inhabits sandy deserts and other arid or semi-arid areas, palm groves, cultivated areas, dunes, and sandy and gravelly plains, often digging its burrow near tussocks of Panicum turgidum or under Tamarix or umbrella thorn acacia trees. It is common in the Nile Delta area, in the Nile Valley and around oases.

== Ecology ==
The greater Egyptian gerbil is nocturnal and terrestrial, excavating a burrow in which it lives during the day; this is similar to the burrow dug by the lesser Egyptian gerbil, which descends to a depth of 60 to 80 cm (24 to 31 in). This gerbil often lives in colonies. It feeds on seeds and grasses, storing some in its burrow. In Sudan, breeding takes place between June and February, with litters averaging three young being born after a 22-day gestation period. The longevity of this gerbil in captivity is two years.

== Status ==
The International Union for Conservation of Nature has rated the conservation status of this gerbil as being of "least concern". This is on the basis that it has a wide range and is presumed to have a large total population, and any decrease in its numbers is unlikely to be significant.
