= List of mammals of Mozambique =

This is a list of the mammal species recorded in Mozambique. Of the mammal species in Mozambique, two are critically endangered, two are endangered, eleven are vulnerable, and ten are near threatened.

The following tags are used to highlight each species' conservation status as assessed by the International Union for Conservation of Nature:

EX	Extinct	No reasonable doubt that the last individual has died.
EW	Extinct in the wild	Known only to survive in captivity or as a naturalized populations well outside its previous range.
CR	Critically endangered	The species is in imminent risk of extinction in the wild.
EN	Endangered	The species is facing an extremely high risk of extinction in the wild.
VU	Vulnerable	The species is facing a high risk of extinction in the wild.
NT	Near threatened	The species does not meet any of the criteria that would categorise it as risking extinction but it is likely to do so in the future.
LC	Least concern	There are no current identifiable risks to the species.
DD	Data deficient	There is inadequate information to make an assessment of the risks to this species.

Some species were assessed using an earlier set of criteria. Species assessed using this system have the following instead of near threatened and least concern categories:

LR/cd	Lower risk/conservation dependent	Species which were the focus of conservation programmes and may have moved into a higher risk category if that programme was discontinued.
LR/nt	Lower risk/near threatened	Species which are close to being classified as vulnerable but are not the subject of conservation programmes.
LR/lc	Lower risk/least concern	Species for which there are no identifiable risks.

== Order: Afrosoricida (tenrecs and golden moles) ==
The order Afrosoricida contains the golden moles of southern Africa and the tenrecs of Madagascar and Africa, two families of small mammals that were traditionally part of the order Insectivora.

- Family: Chrysochloridae
  - Subfamily: Chrysochlorinae
    - Genus: Carpitalpa
      - Arends's golden mole, Carpitalpa arendsi VU
  - Subfamily: Amblysominae
    - Genus: Calcochloris
      - Yellow golden mole, Calcochloris obtusirostris LC

== Order: Macroscelidea (elephant-shrews) ==
Often called sengis, the elephant shrews or jumping shrews are native to southern Africa. Their common English name derives from their elongated flexible snout and their resemblance to the true shrews.

- Family: Macroscelididae (elephant-shrews)
  - Genus: Elephantulus
    - Short-snouted elephant shrew, Elephantulus brachyrhynchus LC
    - Dusky elephant shrew, Elephantulus fuscus DD
    - Eastern rock elephant shrew, Elephantulus myurus LC
  - Genus: Petrodromus
    - Four-toed elephant shrew, Petrodromus tetradactylus LC
  - Genus: Rhynchocyon
    - Checkered elephant shrew, R. cirnei LC

== Order: Tubulidentata (aardvarks) ==
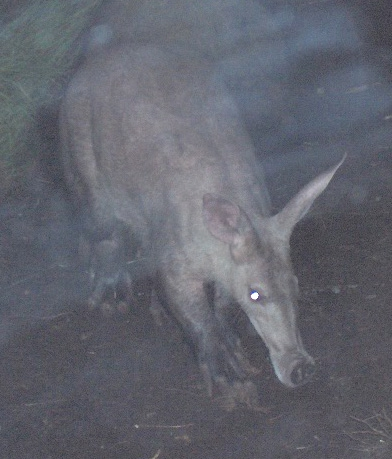
Aardvark

The order Tubulidentata consists of a single species, the aardvark. Tubulidentata are characterised by their teeth which lack a pulp cavity and form thin tubes which are continuously worn down and replaced.

- Family: Orycteropodidae
  - Genus: Orycteropus
    - Aardvark, O. afer LC

== Order: Hyracoidea (hyraxes) ==
The hyraxes are any of four species of fairly small, thickset, herbivorous mammals in the order Hyracoidea. About the size of a domestic cat they are well-furred, with rounded bodies and a stumpy tail. They are native to Africa and the Middle East.

- Family: Procaviidae (hyraxes)
  - Genus: Dendrohyrax
    - Southern tree hyrax, Dendrohyrax arboreus LC
  - Genus: Heterohyrax
    - Yellow-spotted rock hyrax, Heterohyrax brucei LC
  - Genus: Procavia
    - Cape hyrax, Procavia capensis LC

== Order: Proboscidea (elephants) ==
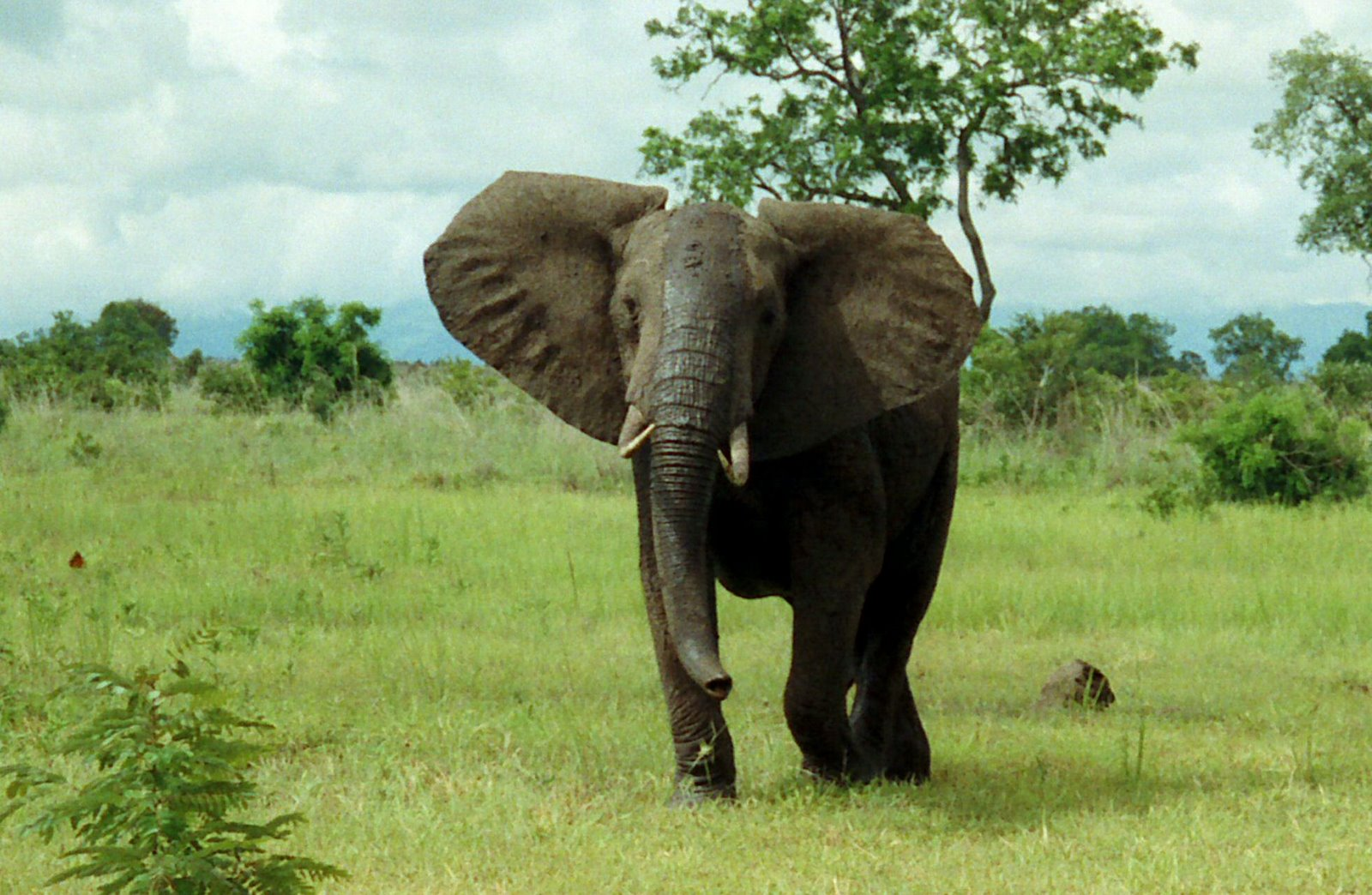
African bush elephant

The elephants comprise three living species and are the largest living land animals.

- Family: Elephantidae (elephants)
  - Genus: Loxodonta
    - African bush elephant, L. africana EN

== Order: Sirenia (manatees and dugongs) ==
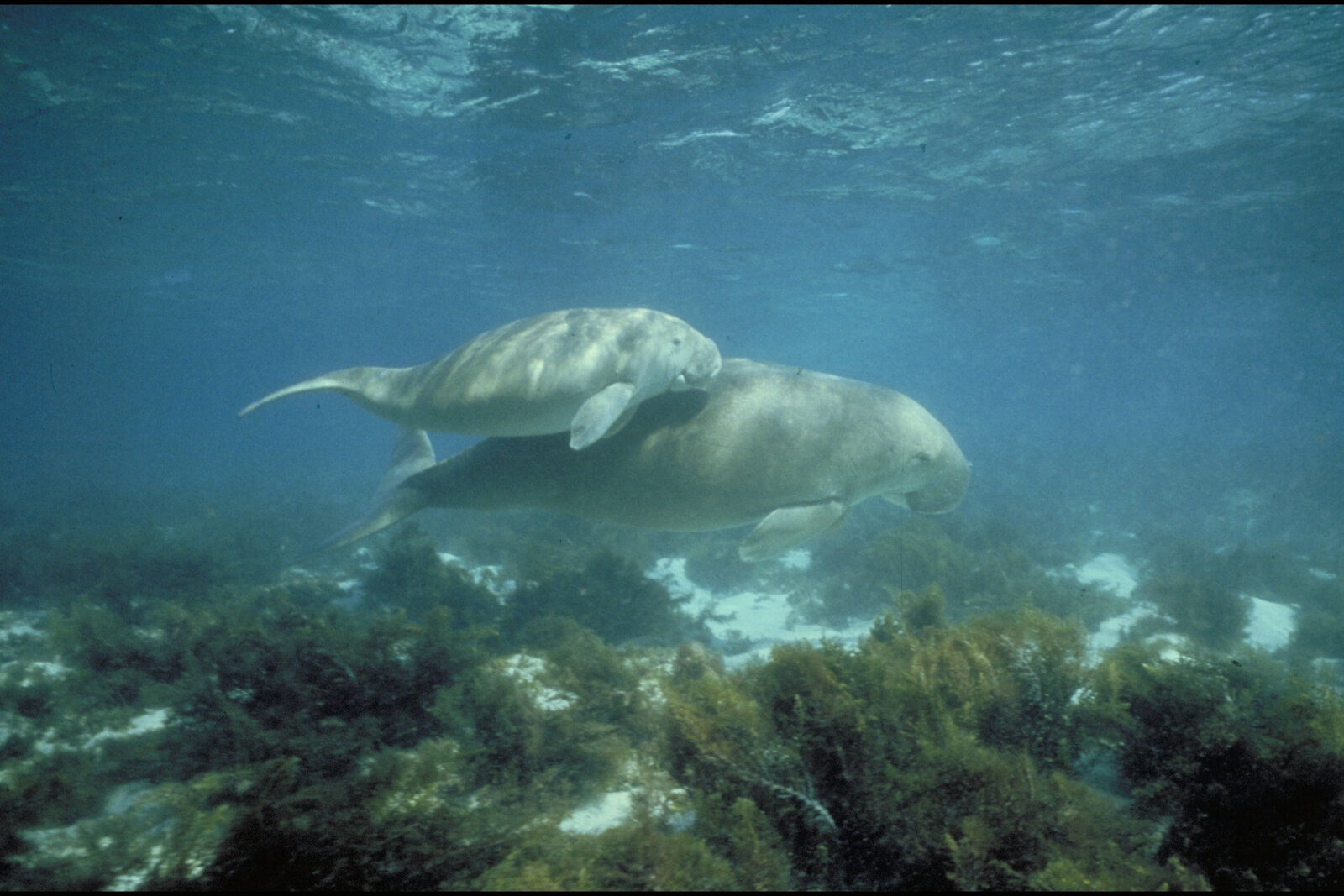
Dugong

Sirenia is an order of fully aquatic, herbivorous mammals that inhabit rivers, estuaries, coastal marine waters, swamps, and marine wetlands. All four species are endangered.

- Family: Dugongidae
  - Genus: Dugong
    - Dugong, Dugong dugon VU

== Order: Primates ==
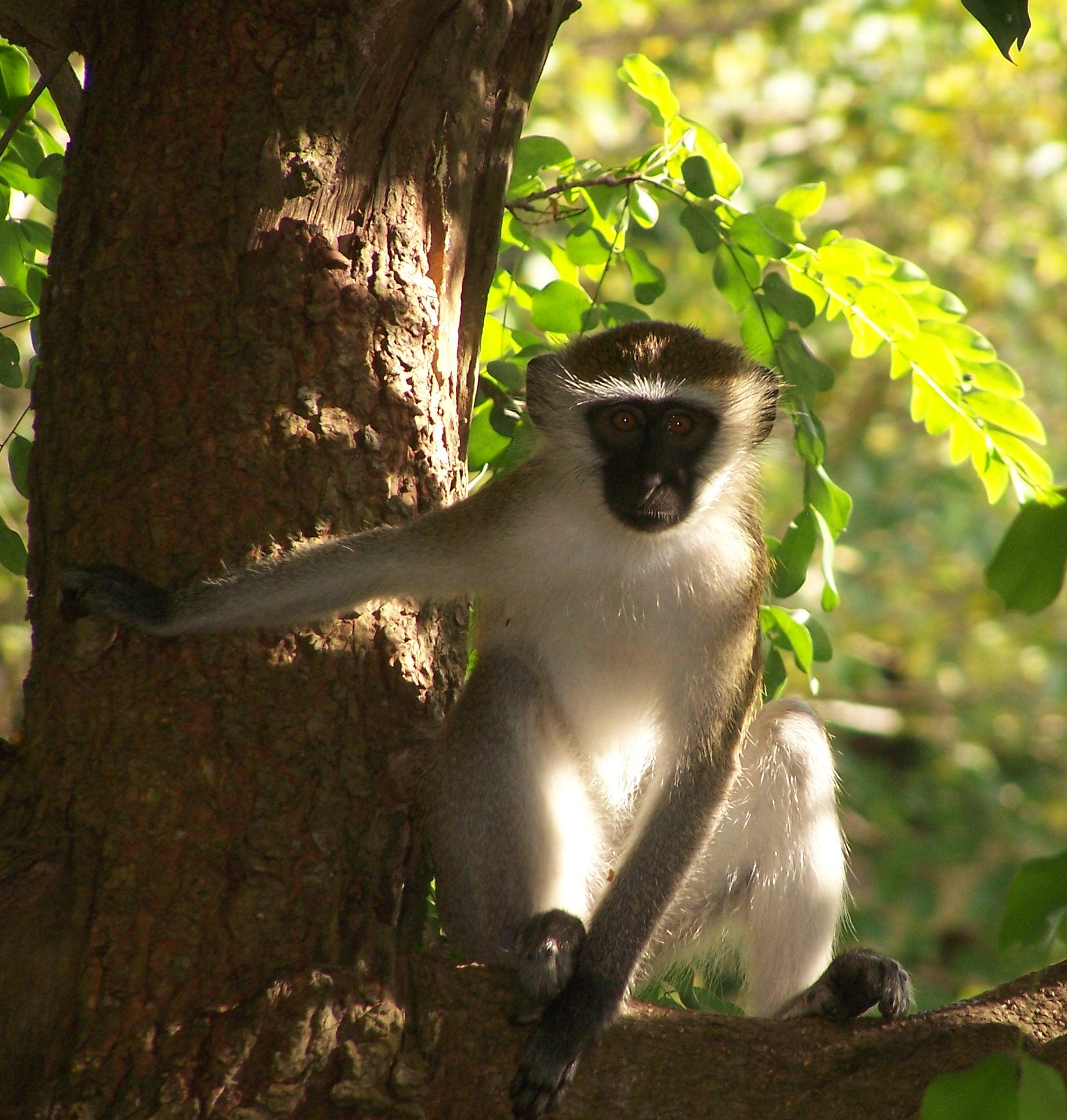
Vervet monkey

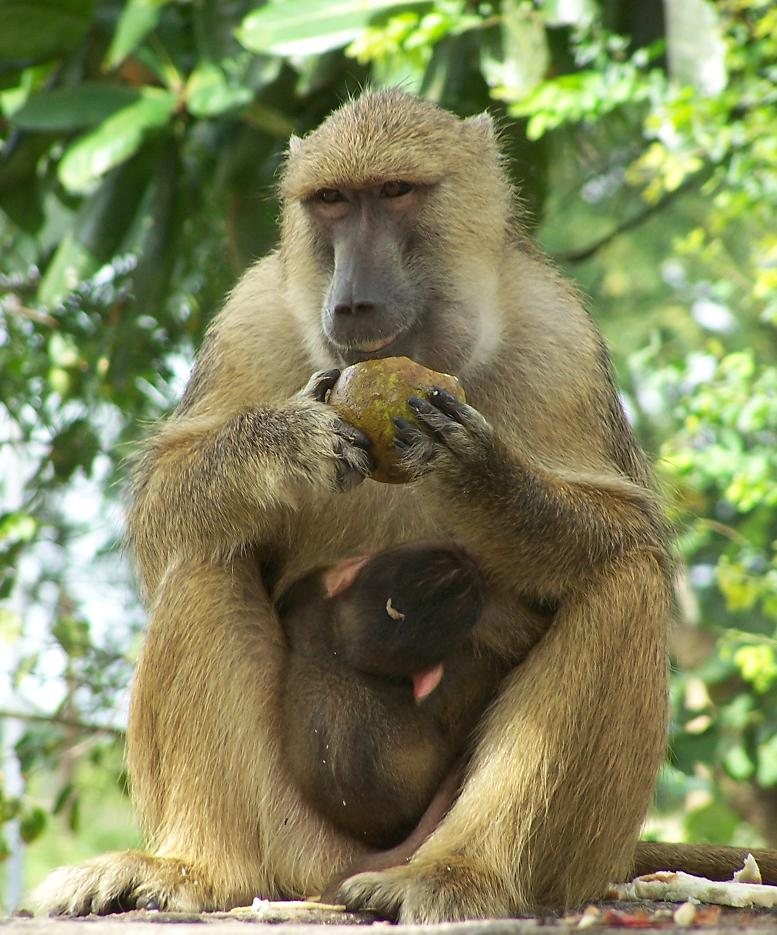
Yellow baboon

The order Primates contains humans and their closest relatives: lemurs, lorisoids, tarsiers, monkeys, and apes.

- Suborder: Strepsirrhini
  - Infraorder: Lemuriformes
    - Superfamily: Lorisoidea
      - Family: Galagidae
        - Genus: Galago
          - Mohol bushbaby, Galago moholi LR/lc
        - Genus: Galagoides
          - Grant's bushbaby, Galagoides granti DD
          - Malawi bushbaby, Galagoides nyasae DD
          - Zanzibar bushbaby, Galagoides zanzibaricus LR/nt
        - Genus: Otolemur
          - Brown greater galago, Otolemur crassicaudatus LR/lc
- Suborder: Haplorhini
  - Infraorder: Simiiformes
    - Parvorder: Catarrhini
      - Superfamily: Cercopithecoidea
        - Family: Cercopithecidae (Old World monkeys)
          - Genus: Chlorocebus
            - Vervet monkey, Chlorocebus pygerythrus LR/lc
          - Genus: Cercopithecus
            - Blue monkey, Cercopithecus mitis LR/lc
          - Genus: Papio
            - Yellow baboon, Papio cynocephalus LR/lc
            - Chacma baboon, Papio ursinus LR/lc

== Order: Rodentia (rodents) ==
Rodents make up the largest order of mammals, with over 40% of mammalian species. They have two incisors in the upper and lower jaw which grow continually and must be kept short by gnawing. Most rodents are small though the capybara can weigh up to 45 kg (99 lb).

- Suborder: Hystricognathi
  - Family: Bathyergidae
    - Genus: Cryptomys
      - Mashona mole-rat, Cryptomys darlingi LC
      - Common mole-rat, Cryptomys hottentotus LC
    - Genus: Heliophobius
      - Silvery mole-rat, Heliophobius argenteocinereus LC
  - Family: Hystricidae (Old World porcupines)
    - Genus: Hystrix
      - Cape porcupine, Hystrix africaeaustralis LC
  - Family: Thryonomyidae (cane rats)
    - Genus: Thryonomys
      - Lesser cane rat, Thryonomys gregorianus LC
      - Greater cane rat, Thryonomys swinderianus LC
- Suborder: Sciurognathi
  - Family: Anomaluridae
    - Subfamily: Anomalurinae
      - Genus: Anomalurus
        - Lord Derby's scaly-tailed squirrel, Anomalurus derbianus LC
  - Family: Pedetidae (spring hare)
    - Genus: Pedetes
      - Springhare, Pedetes capensis LC
  - Family: Sciuridae (squirrels)
    - Subfamily: Xerinae
      - Tribe: Protoxerini
        - Genus: Heliosciurus
          - Mutable sun squirrel, Heliosciurus mutabilis LC
        - Genus: Paraxerus
          - Smith's bush squirrel, Paraxerus cepapi LC
          - Striped bush squirrel, Paraxerus flavovittis DD
          - Red bush squirrel, Paraxerus palliatus LC
          - Vincent's bush squirrel, Paraxerus vincenti CR
  - Family: Gliridae (dormice)
    - Subfamily: Graphiurinae
      - Genus: Graphiurus
        - Small-eared dormouse, Graphiurus microtis LC
        - Rock dormouse, Graphiurus platyops LC
  - Family: Nesomyidae
    - Subfamily: Dendromurinae
      - Genus: Dendromus
        - Gray climbing mouse, Dendromus melanotis LC
        - Brants's climbing mouse, Dendromus mesomelas LC
        - Chestnut climbing mouse, Dendromus mystacalis LC
        - Nyika climbing mouse, Dendromus nyikae LC
      - Genus: Steatomys
        - Tiny fat mouse, Steatomys parvus LC
        - Fat mouse, Steatomys pratensis LC
    - Subfamily: Cricetomyinae
      - Genus: Cricetomys
        - Gambian pouched rat, Cricetomys gambianus LC
      - Genus: Saccostomus
        - South African pouched mouse, Saccostomus campestris LC
  - Family: Muridae (mice, rats, voles, gerbils, hamsters, etc.)
    - Subfamily: Deomyinae
      - Genus: Acomys
        - Spiny mouse, Acomys spinosissimus LC
      - Genus: Lophuromys
        - Yellow-spotted brush-furred rat, Lophuromys flavopunctatus LC
      - Genus: Uranomys
        - Rudd's mouse, Uranomys ruddi LC
    - Subfamily: Otomyinae
      - Genus: Otomys
        - Angoni vlei rat, Otomys angoniensis LC
        - Vlei rat, Otomys irroratus LC
    - Subfamily: Gerbillinae
      - Genus: Gerbillurus
        - Hairy-footed gerbil, Gerbillurus paeba LC
      - Genus: Tatera
        - Boehm's gerbil, Tatera boehmi LC
        - Gorongoza gerbil, Tatera inclusa LC
        - Bushveld gerbil, Tatera leucogaster LC
    - Subfamily: Murinae
      - Genus: Aethomys
        - Red rock rat, Aethomys chrysophilus LC
        - Namaqua rock rat, Aethomys namaquensis LC
        - Silinda rock rat, Aethomys silindensis VU
      - Genus: Grammomys
        - Mozambique thicket rat, Grammomys cometes LC
        - Woodland thicket rat, Grammomys dolichurus LC
      - Genus: Lemniscomys
        - Single-striped grass mouse, Lemniscomys rosalia LC
      - Genus: Mastomys
        - Southern multimammate mouse, Mastomys coucha LC
        - Natal multimammate mouse, Mastomys natalensis LC
      - Genus: Mus
        - African pygmy mouse, Mus minutoides LC
        - Neave's mouse, Mus neavei DD
        - Gray-bellied pygmy mouse, Mus triton LC
      - Genus: Pelomys
        - Creek groove-toothed swamp rat, Pelomys fallax LC
      - Genus: Praomys
        - Delectable soft-furred mouse, Praomys delectorum NT
      - Genus: Rhabdomys
        - Four-striped grass mouse, Rhabdomys pumilio LC
      - Genus: Thallomys
        - Acacia rat, Thallomys paedulcus LC

== Order: Lagomorpha (lagomorphs) ==
The lagomorphs comprise two families, Leporidae (hares and rabbits), and Ochotonidae (pikas). Though they can resemble rodents, and were classified as a superfamily in that order until the early 20th century, they have since been considered a separate order. They differ from rodents in a number of physical characteristics, such as having four incisors in the upper jaw rather than two.

- Family: Leporidae (rabbits, hares)
  - Genus: Pronolagus
    - Natal red rock hare, Pronolagus crassicaudatus LR/lc
    - Jameson's red rock hare, Pronolagus randensis LR/lc
  - Genus: Lepus
    - Cape hare, Lepus capensis LR/lc
    - African savanna hare, Lepus microtis LR/lc

== Order: Erinaceomorpha (hedgehogs and gymnures) ==
The order Erinaceomorpha contains a single family, Erinaceidae, which comprise the hedgehogs and gymnures. The hedgehogs are easily recognised by their spines while gymnures look more like large rats.

- Family: Erinaceidae (hedgehogs)
  - Subfamily: Erinaceinae
    - Genus: Atelerix
      - Four-toed hedgehog, Atelerix albiventris LR/lc

== Order: Soricomorpha (shrews, moles, and solenodons) ==
The "shrew-forms" are insectivorous mammals. The shrews and solenodons closely resemble mice while the moles are stout-bodied burrowers.

- Family: Soricidae (shrews)
  - Subfamily: Crocidurinae
    - Genus: Crocidura
      - Reddish-gray musk shrew, Crocidura cyanea LC
      - Greater red musk shrew, Crocidura flavescens LC
      - Bicolored musk shrew, Crocidura fuscomurina LC
      - Lesser red musk shrew, Crocidura hirta LC
      - Moonshine shrew, Crocidura luna LC
      - Swamp musk shrew, Crocidura mariquensis LC
      - African giant shrew, Crocidura olivieri LC
      - Lesser gray-brown musk shrew, Crocidura silacea LC
    - Genus: Suncus
      - Lesser dwarf shrew, Suncus varilla LC
    - Genus: Sylvisorex
      - Climbing shrew, Sylvisorex megalura LC
  - Subfamily: Myosoricinae
    - Genus: Myosorex
      - Dark-footed mouse shrew, Myosorex cafer LC
      - Thin mouse shrew, Myosorex tenuis DD

== Order: Chiroptera (bats) ==
The bats' most distinguishing feature is that their forelimbs are developed as wings, making them the only mammals capable of flight. Bat species account for about 20% of all mammals.

- Family: Pteropodidae (flying foxes, Old World fruit bats)
  - Subfamily: Pteropodinae
    - Genus: Eidolon
      - Straw-coloured fruit bat, Eidolon helvum LC
    - Genus: Epomophorus
      - Peters's epauletted fruit bat, Epomophorus crypturus LC
      - Ethiopian epauletted fruit bat, Epomophorus labiatus LC
      - Wahlberg's epauletted fruit bat, Epomophorus wahlbergi LC
    - Genus: Epomops
      - Dobson's epauletted fruit bat, Epomops dobsoni LC
    - Genus: Lissonycteris
      - Harrison's fruit bat, Lissonycteris goliath VU
    - Genus: Rousettus
      - Egyptian fruit bat, Rousettus aegyptiacus LC
- Family: Vespertilionidae
  - Subfamily: Kerivoulinae
    - Genus: Kerivoula
      - Damara woolly bat, Kerivoula argentata LC
  - Subfamily: Myotinae
    - Genus: Myotis
      - Rufous mouse-eared bat, Myotis bocagii LC
      - Cape hairy bat, Myotis tricolor LC
      - Welwitsch's bat, Myotis welwitschii LC
  - Subfamily: Vespertilioninae
    - Genus: Eptesicus
      - Long-tailed house bat, Eptesicus hottentotus LC
    - Genus: Glauconycteris
      - Butterfly bat, Glauconycteris variegata LC
    - Genus: Mimetillus
      - Moloney's mimic bat, Mimetillus moloneyi LC
    - Genus: Neoromicia
      - Cape serotine, Neoromicia capensis LC
      - Yellow serotine, Neoromicia flavescens DD
      - Melck's house bat, Neoromicia melckorum DD
      - Banana pipistrelle, Neoromicia nanus LC
      - Rendall's serotine, Neoromicia rendalli LC
    - Genus: Nyctalus
      - Common noctule, Nyctalus noctula LR/lc
    - Genus: Nycticeinops
      - Schlieffen's bat, Nycticeinops schlieffeni LC
    - Genus: Pipistrellus
      - Rüppell's pipistrelle, Pipistrellus rueppelli LC
      - Rusty pipistrelle, Pipistrellus rusticus LC
    - Genus: Scotoecus
      - White-bellied lesser house bat, Scotoecus albigula DD
      - Light-winged lesser house bat, Scotoecus albofuscus DD
      - Hinde's lesser house bat, Scotoecus hindei DD
      - Dark-winged lesser house bat, Scotoecus hirundo DD
    - Genus: Scotophilus
      - African yellow bat, Scotophilus dinganii LC
      - Schreber's yellow bat, Scotophilus nigrita NT
      - Greenish yellow bat, Scotophilus viridis LC
  - Subfamily: Miniopterinae
    - Genus: Miniopterus
      - Lesser long-fingered bat, Miniopterus fraterculus LC
      - Greater long-fingered bat, Miniopterus inflatus LC
      - Natal long-fingered bat, Miniopterus natalensis NT
- Family: Molossidae
  - Genus: Chaerephon
    - Spotted free-tailed bat, Chaerephon bivittata LC
    - Nigerian free-tailed bat, Chaerephon nigeriae LC
    - Little free-tailed bat, Chaerephon pumila LC
  - Genus: Mops
    - Sierra Leone free-tailed bat, Mops brachypterus LC
    - Angolan free-tailed bat, Mops condylurus LC
    - Midas free-tailed bat, Mops midas LC
  - Genus: Sauromys
    - Roberts's flat-headed bat, Sauromys petrophilus LC
  - Genus: Tadarida
    - African giant free-tailed bat, Tadarida ventralis NT
- Family: Emballonuridae
  - Genus: Coleura
    - African sheath-tailed bat, Coleura afra LC
  - Genus: Taphozous
    - Mauritian tomb bat, Taphozous mauritianus LC
- Family: Nycteridae
  - Genus: Nycteris
    - Large slit-faced bat, Nycteris grandis LC
    - Hairy slit-faced bat, Nycteris hispida LC
    - Large-eared slit-faced bat, Nycteris macrotis LC
    - Egyptian slit-faced bat, Nycteris thebaica LC
    - Vinson's slit-faced bat, Nycteris vinsoni DD
    - Wood's slit-faced bat, Nycteris woodi NT
- Family: Rhinolophidae
  - Subfamily: Rhinolophinae
    - Genus: Rhinolophus
      - Blasius's horseshoe bat, R. blasii LC
      - Geoffroy's horseshoe bat, Rhinolophus clivosus LC
      - Darling's horseshoe bat, Rhinolophus darlingi LC
      - Rüppell's horseshoe bat, Rhinolophus fumigatus LC
      - Hildebrandt's horseshoe bat, Rhinolophus hildebrandti LC
      - Lander's horseshoe bat, Rhinolophus landeri LC
      - Bushveld horseshoe bat, Rhinolophus simulator LC
      - Swinny's horseshoe bat, Rhinolophus swinnyi
      - Mount Mabu horseshoe bat Rhinolophus mabuensis
      - Smithers's horseshoe bat Rhinolophus smithersi
      - Mozambican horseshoe bat Rhinolophus mossambicus NT
  - Subfamily: Hipposiderinae
    - Genus: Cloeotis
      - Percival's trident bat, Cloeotis percivali VU
    - Genus: Hipposideros
      - Sundevall's roundleaf bat, Hipposideros caffer LC
      - Commerson's roundleaf bat, Hipposideros marungensis NT
      - Noack's roundleaf bat, Hipposideros ruber LC
    - Genus: Triaenops
      - Persian trident bat, Triaenops persicus LC

== Order: Pholidota (pangolins) ==
The order Pholidota comprises the eight species of pangolin. Pangolins are anteaters and have the powerful claws, elongated snout and long tongue seen in the other unrelated anteater species.

- Family: Manidae
  - Genus: Smutsia
    - Ground pangolin, S. temminckii VU

== Order: Cetacea (whales) ==
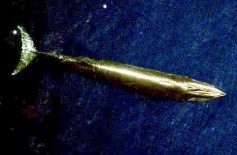
Bryde's whale

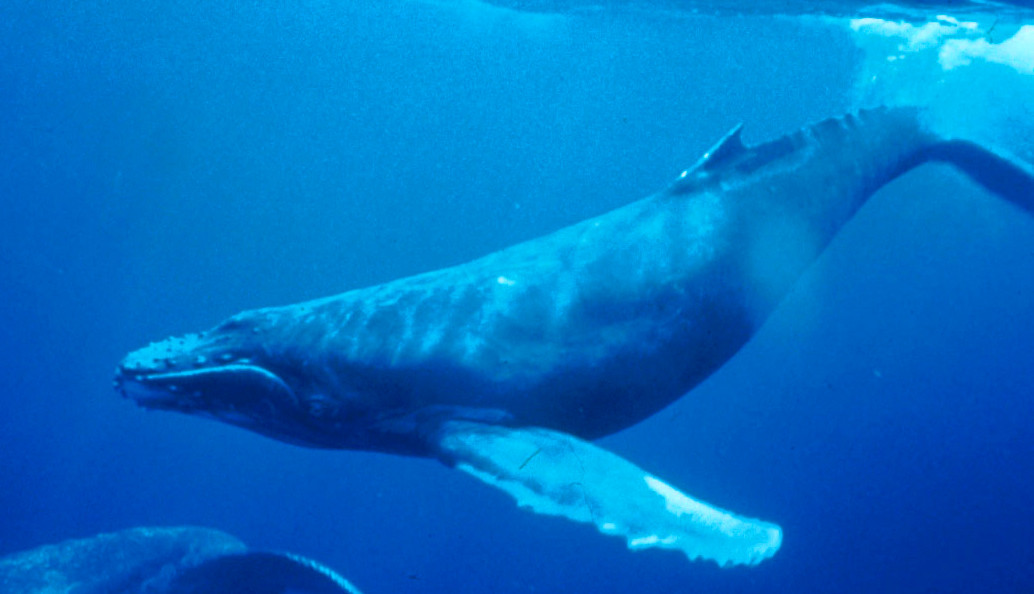
Humpback whale

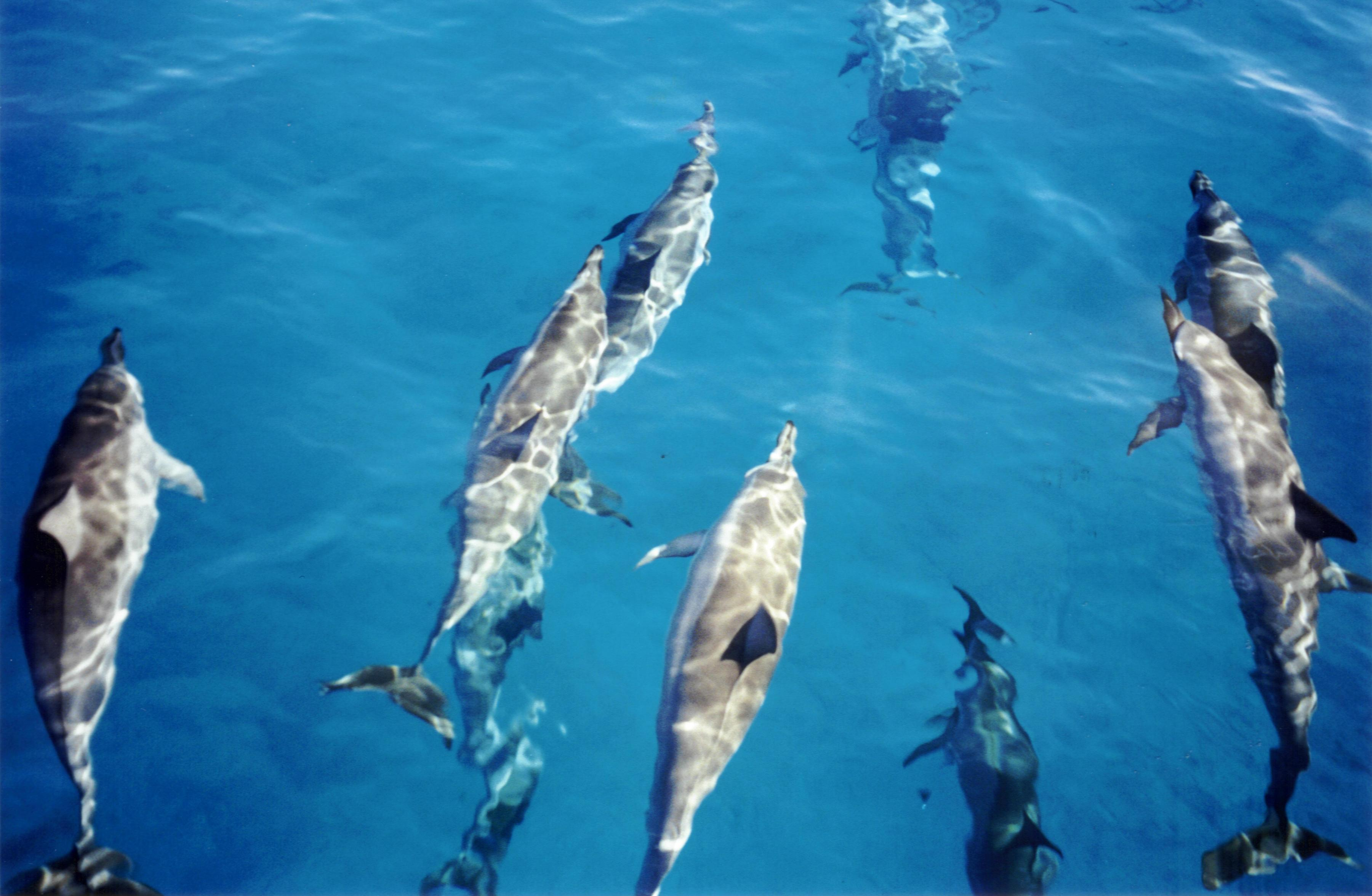
Spinner dolphin

The order Cetacea includes whales, dolphins and porpoises. They are the mammals most fully adapted to aquatic life with a spindle-shaped nearly hairless body, protected by a thick layer of blubber, and forelimbs and tail modified to provide propulsion underwater.

- Suborder: Mysticeti
  - Family: Balaenidae
    - Genus: Eubalaena
      - Southern right whale, Eubalaena australis LR/cd (still very rare in Mozambique)
  - Family: Balaenopteridae
    - Subfamily: Balaenopterinae
      - Genus: Balaenoptera
        - Southern blue whale, Balaenoptera musculus intermedia EN
        - Pygmy blue whale, Balaenoptera musculus brevicauda DD
        - Southern fin whale, Balaenoptera physalus quoyi EN
        - Southern sei whale, Balaenoptera borealis schlegelii EN
        - Bryde's whale, Balaenoptera edeni DD
        - Antarctic minke whale, Balaenoptera bonaerensis DD
    - Subfamily: Megapterinae
      - Genus: Megaptera
        - Humpback whale, Megaptera novaeangliae VU
- Suborder: Odontoceti
  - Superfamily: Platanistoidea
    - Family: Physeteridae
      - Genus: Physeter
        - Sperm whale, Physeter macrocephalus VU
    - Family: Kogiidae
      - Genus: Kogia
        - Pygmy sperm whale, Kogia breviceps LR/lc
        - Dwarf sperm whale, Kogia sima LR/lc
    - Family: Ziphidae
      - Subfamily: Hyperoodontinae
        - Genus: Mesoplodon
          - Blainville's beaked whale, Mesoplodon densirostris DD
          - Gray's beaked whale, Mesoplodon grayi DD
          - Hector's beaked whale, Mesoplodon hectori DD
          - Layard's beaked whale, Mesoplodon layardii DD
          - True's beaked whale, Mesoplodon mirus DD
    - Family: Delphinidae (marine dolphins)
      - Genus: Steno
        - Rough-toothed dolphin, Steno bredanensis DD
      - Genus: Sousa
        - Indian humpback dolphin, Sousa chinensis DD
      - Genus: Tursiops
        - Indo-Pacific bottlenose dolphin, Tursiops aduncus DD
        - Common bottlenose dolphin, Tursiops truncatus DD
      - Genus: Stenella
        - Striped dolphin, Stenella coeruleoalba LR/cd
        - Spinner dolphin, Stenella longirostris LR/cd
        - Pantropical spotted dolphin, Stenella attenuata LR/cd
      - Genus: Lagenodelphis
        - Fraser's dolphin, Lagenodelphis hosei DD
      - Genus: Lissodelphis
        - Southern right whale dolphin, Lissodelphis peronii DD
      - Genus: Grampus
        - Risso's dolphin, Grampus griseus DD
      - Genus: Peponocephala
        - Melon-headed whale, Peponocephala electra LR/lc
      - Genus: Feresa
        - Pygmy killer whale, Feresa attenuata DD
      - Genus: Globicephala
        - Short-finned pilot whale, Globicephala macrorhynchus LR/cd
      - Genus: Orcinus
        - Orca, Orcinus orca LR/cd

== Order: Carnivora (carnivorans) ==
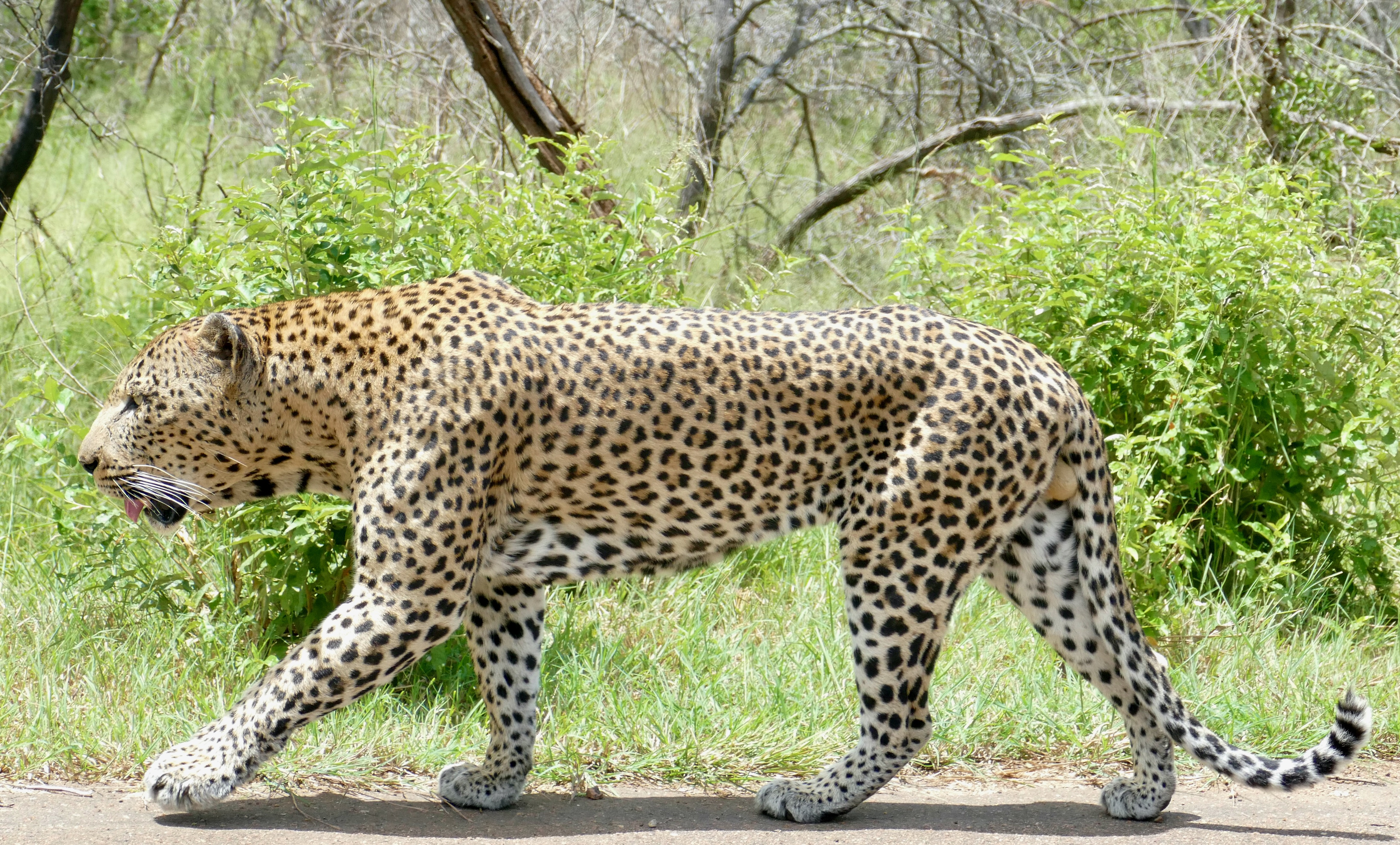
African leopard

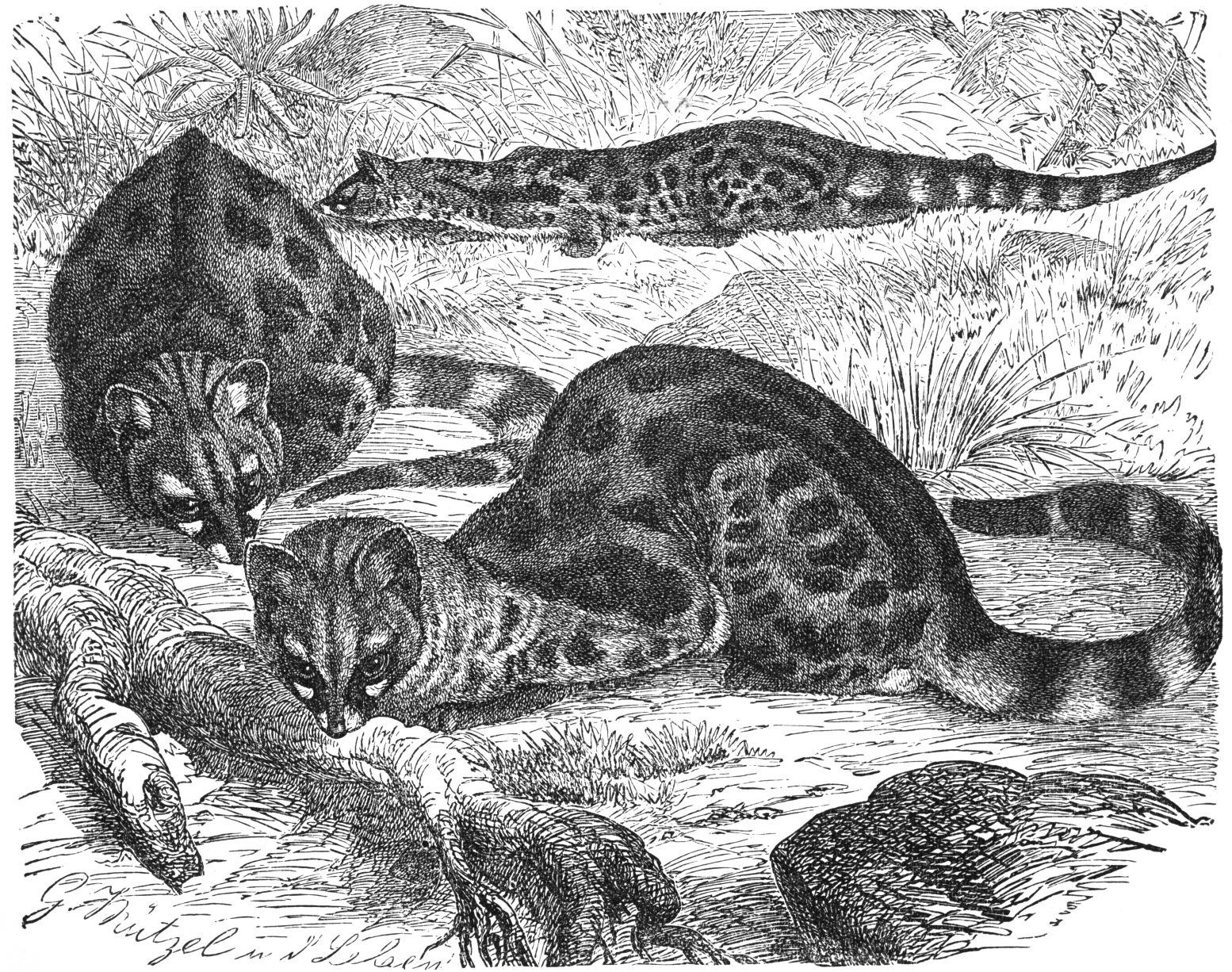
Common genet

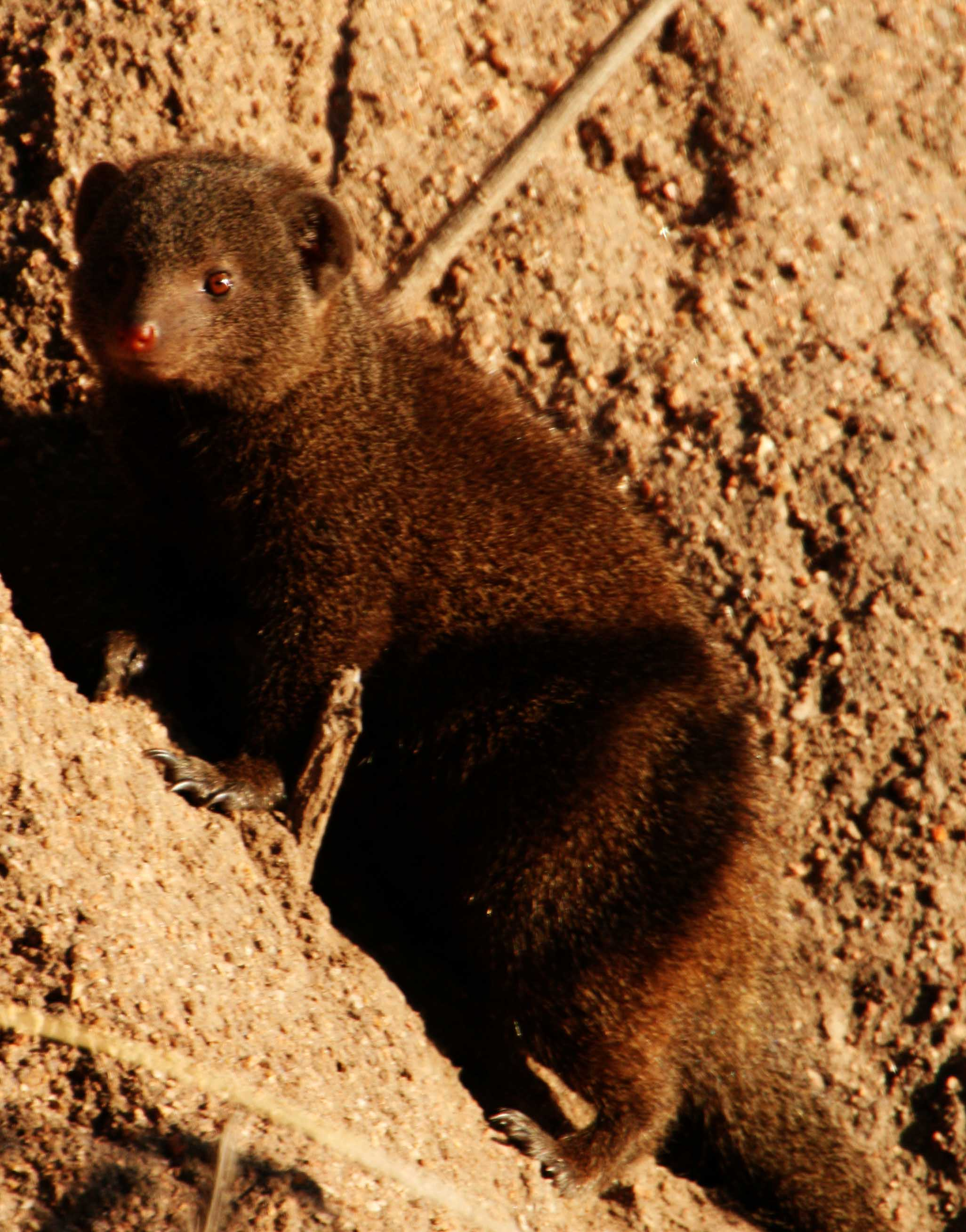
Common dwarf mongoose

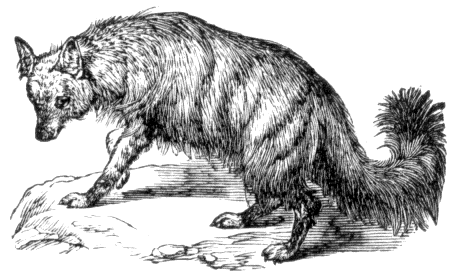
Aardwolf

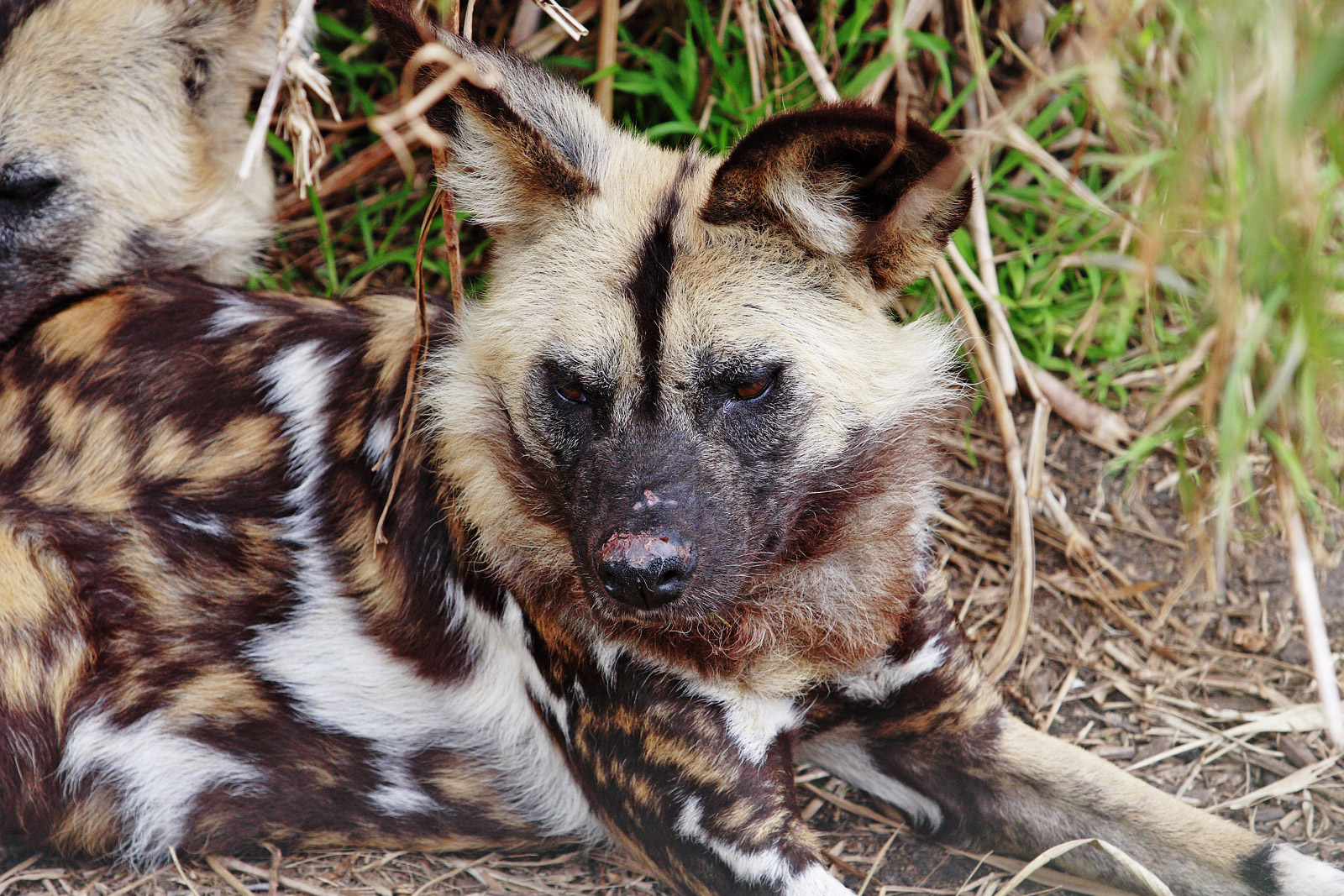
African wild dog

There are over 260 species of carnivorans, the majority of which feed primarily on meat. They have a characteristic skull shape and dentition.

- Suborder: Feliformia
  - Family: Felidae (cats)
    - Subfamily: Felinae
      - Genus: Acinonyx
        - Cheetah, Acinonyx jubatus VU
          - Southeast African cheetah, A.j. jubatus
      - Genus: Caracal
        - Caracal, Caracal caracal LC
      - Genus: Felis
        - African wildcat, F. lybica LC
      - Genus: Leptailurus
        - Serval, Leptailurus serval LC
    - Subfamily: Pantherinae
      - Genus: Panthera
        - Lion, Panthera leo VU
          - Panthera leo melanochaita
        - Leopard, Panthera pardus NT
          - African leopard, P.p. pardus
  - Family: Viverridae
    - Subfamily: Viverrinae
      - Genus: Civettictis
        - African civet, Civettictis civetta LC
      - Genus: Genetta
        - Angolan genet, Genetta angolensis LC
        - Common genet, Genetta genetta LC
        - Rusty-spotted genet, Genetta maculata LC
  - Family: Nandiniidae
    - Genus: Nandinia
      - African palm civet, Nandinia binotata LC
  - Family: Herpestidae (mongooses)
    - Genus: Atilax
      - Marsh mongoose, Atilax paludinosus LC
    - Genus: Bdeogale
      - Bushy-tailed mongoose, B. crassicauda LC
    - Genus: Helogale
      - Common dwarf mongoose, Helogale parvula LC
    - Genus: Herpestes
      - Egyptian mongoose, Herpestes ichneumon LC
      - Common slender mongoose, Herpestes sanguineus LC
    - Genus: Ichneumia
      - White-tailed mongoose, Ichneumia albicauda LC
    - Genus: Mungos
      - Banded mongoose, Mungos mungo LC
    - Genus: Paracynictis
      - Selous' mongoose, Paracynictis selousi LC
    - Genus: Rhynchogale
      - Meller's mongoose, Rhynchogale melleri LC
  - Family: Hyaenidae (hyaenas)
    - Genus: Crocuta
      - Spotted hyena, Crocuta crocuta LC
    - Genus: Parahyaena
      - Brown hyena, P. brunnea NT presence uncertain
    - Genus: Proteles
      - Aardwolf, Proteles cristatus LC
- Suborder: Caniformia
  - Family: Canidae (dogs, foxes)
    - Genus: Lupulella
      - Side-striped jackal, L. adusta LC
      - Black-backed jackal, L. mesomelas LC
    - Genus: Otocyon
      - Bat-eared fox, Otocyon megalotis LC
    - Genus: Lycaon
      - Cape wild dog, Lycaon pictus EN
  - Family: Mustelidae (mustelids)
    - Genus: Ictonyx
      - Striped polecat, Ictonyx striatus LC
    - Genus: Poecilogale
      - African striped weasel, Poecilogale albinucha LC
    - Genus: Mellivora
      - Honey badger, M. capensis LC
    - Genus: Lutra
      - Speckle-throated otter, Lutra maculicollis LC
    - Genus: Aonyx
      - African clawless otter, Aonyx capensis LC
  - Family: Otariidae (eared seals, sealions)
    - Genus: Arctocephalus
      - Cape fur seal, Arctocephalus pusillus LC
  - Family: Phocidae (earless seals)
    - Genus: Mirounga
      - Southern elephant seal, Mirounga leonina LC

== Order: Perissodactyla (odd-toed ungulates) ==
The odd-toed ungulates are browsing and grazing mammals. They are usually large to very large, and have relatively simple stomachs and a large middle toe.

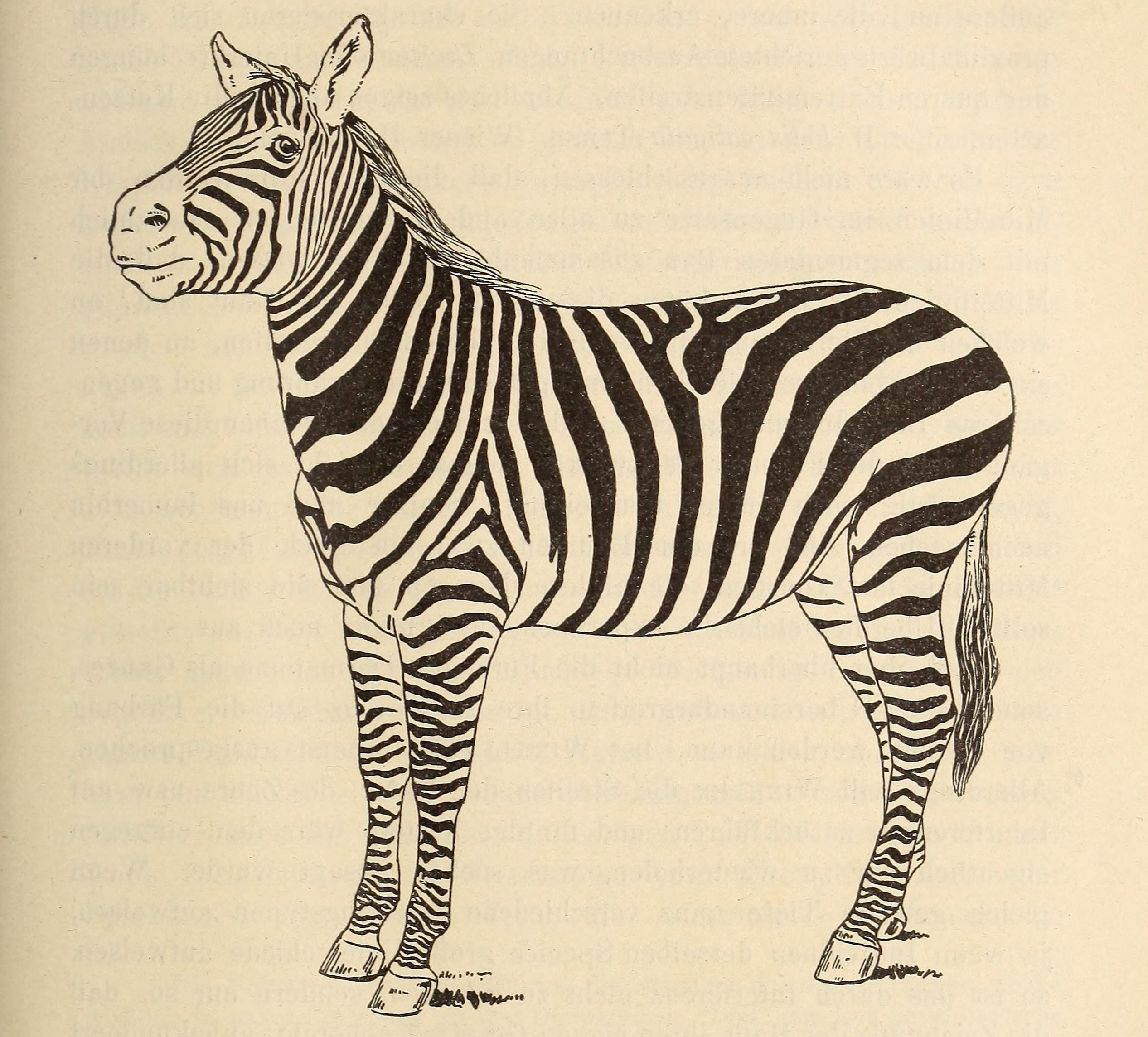
Selous' zebra

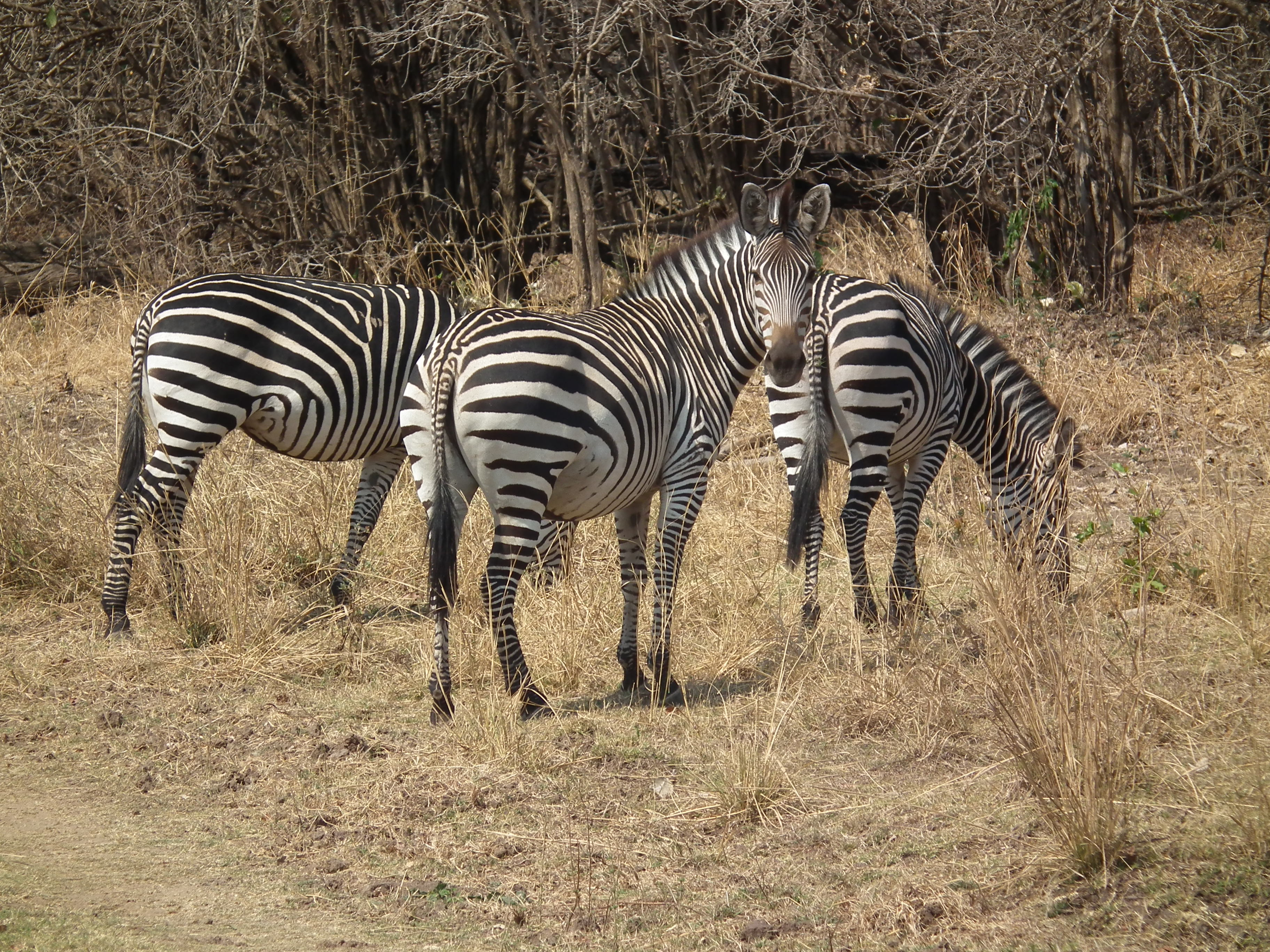
Crawshay's zebra

- Family: Equidae (horses etc.)
  - Genus: Equus
    - Plains zebra, Equus quagga NT
      - Crawshay's zebra, Equus quagga crawshayi NT
      - Selous' zebra, Equus quagga selousi CR
- Family: Rhinocerotidae
  - Genus: Diceros
    - South-central black rhinoceros, Diceros bicornis minor CR
  - Genus: Ceratotherium
    - Southern white rhinoceros, Ceratotherium simum simum NT

== Order: Artiodactyla (even-toed ungulates) ==
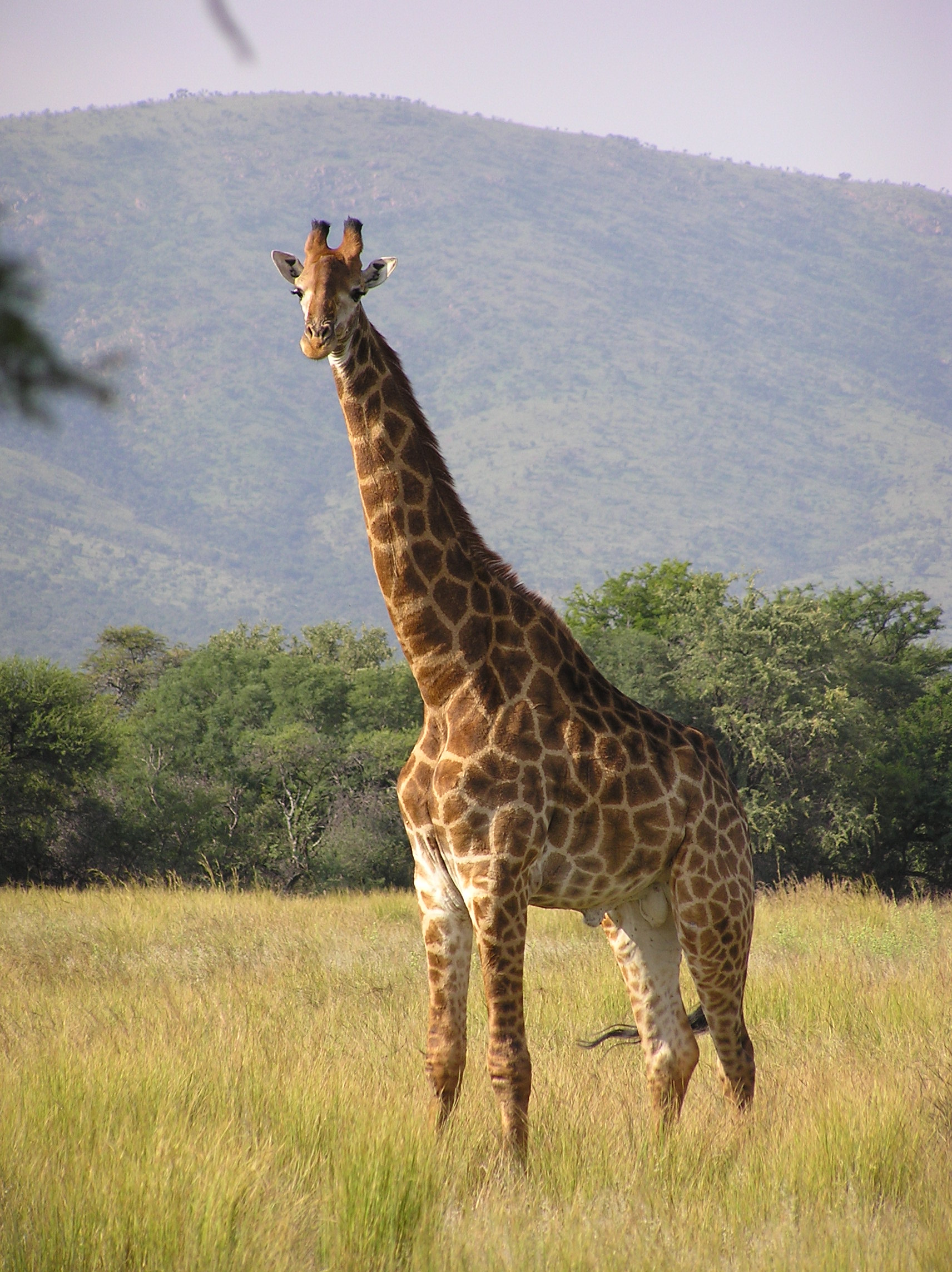
Southern giraffe

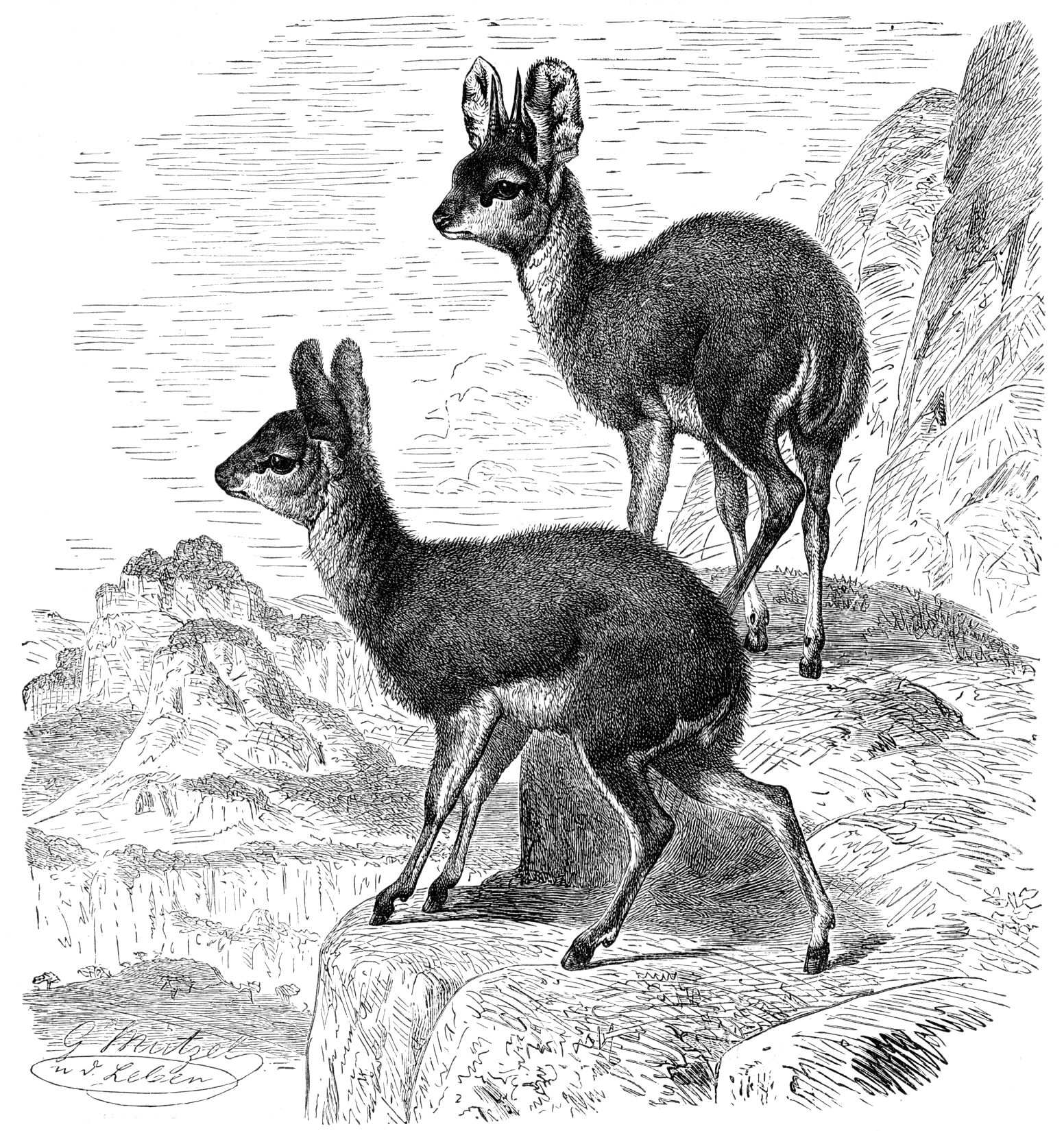
Klipspringer

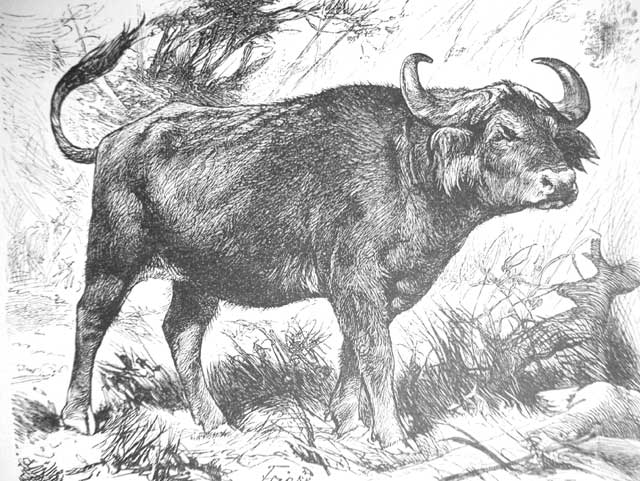
African buffalo

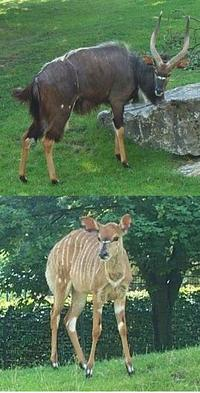
Nyala

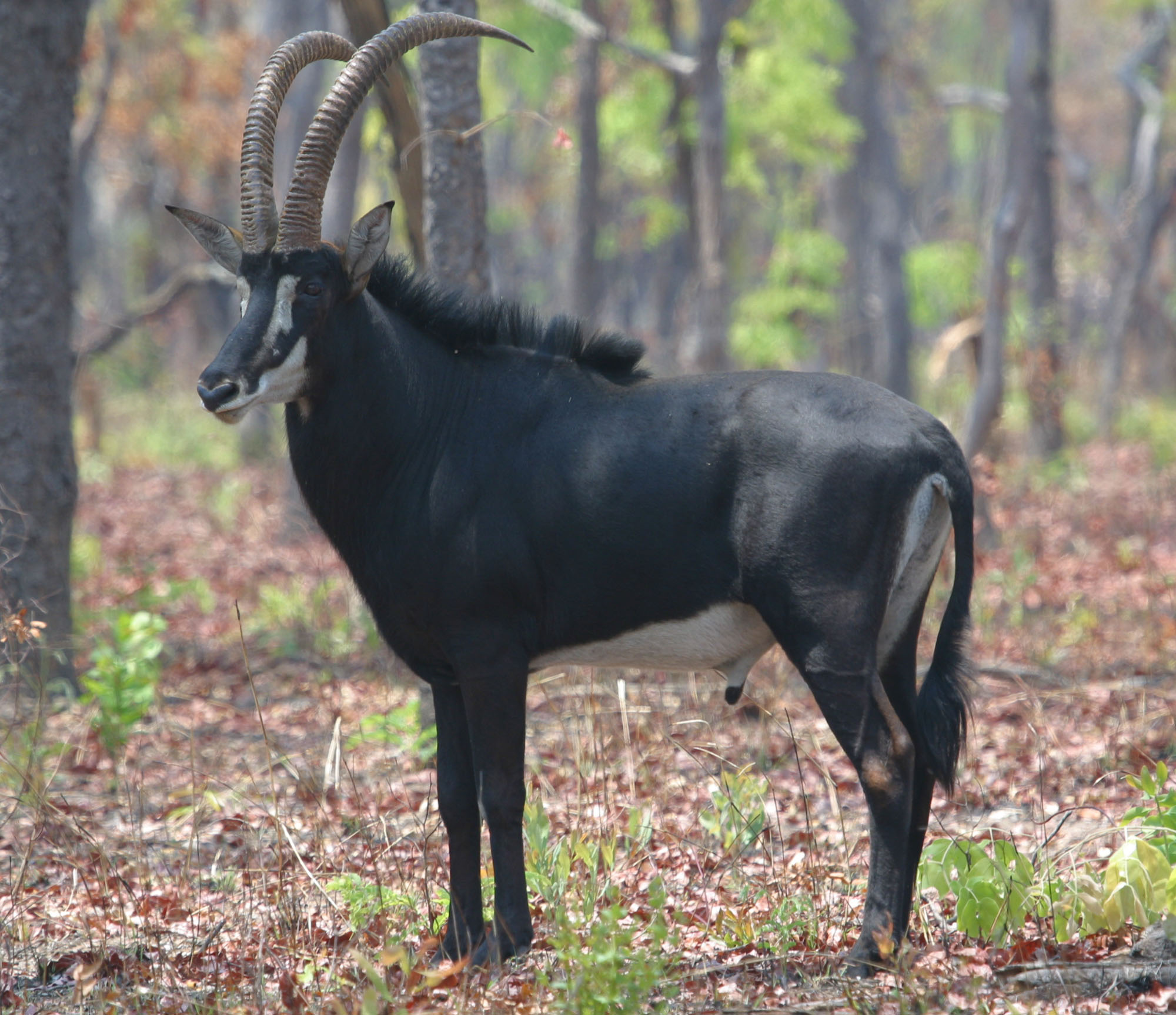
Sable antelope

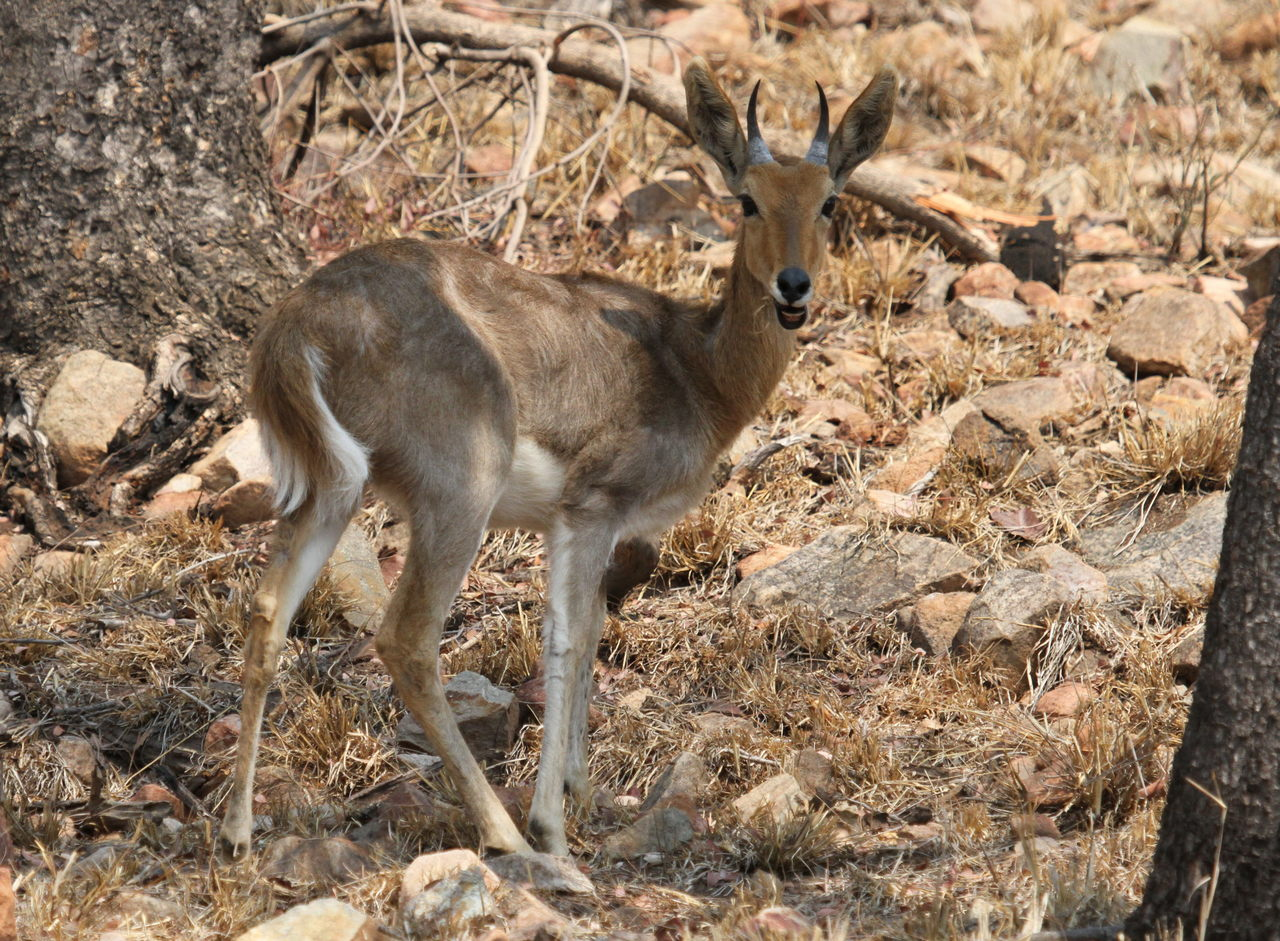
Mountain reedbuck

The even-toed ungulates are ungulates whose weight is borne about equally by the third and fourth toes, rather than mostly or entirely by the third as in perissodactyls. There are about 220 artiodactyl species, including many that are of great economic importance to humans.

- Family: Suidae (pigs)
  - Subfamily: Phacochoerinae
    - Genus: Phacochoerus
      - Common warthog, Phacochoerus africanus
  - Subfamily: Suinae
    - Genus: Potamochoerus
      - Bushpig, Potamochoerus larvatus
- Family: Hippopotamidae (hippopotamuses)
  - Genus: Hippopotamus
    - Hippopotamus, H. amphibius VU
- Family: Giraffidae (giraffe, okapi)
  - Genus: Giraffa
    - South African giraffe, Giraffa giraffa giraffa VU
- Family: Bovidae (cattle, antelope, sheep, goats)
  - Subfamily: Alcelaphinae
    - Genus: Alcelaphus
      - Lichtenstein's hartebeest, Alcelaphus lichtensteinii
    - Genus: Connochaetes
      - Blue wildebeest, Connochaetes taurinus
    - Genus: Damaliscus
      - Topi, Damaliscus lunatus LC - regionally extinct
  - Subfamily: Antilopinae
    - Genus: Neotragus
      - Suni, Neotragus moschatus
    - Genus: Oreotragus
      - Klipspringer, Oreotragus oreotragus
    - Genus: Ourebia
      - Oribi, Ourebia ourebi
    - Genus: Raphicerus
      - Steenbok, Raphicerus campestris
      - Sharpe's grysbok, Raphicerus sharpei
  - Subfamily: Bovinae
    - Genus: Syncerus
      - African buffalo, S. caffer NT
    - Genus: Tragelaphus
      - Nyala, Tragelaphus angasii
      - Common eland, Tragelaphus oryx
      - Bushbuck, Tragelaphus scriptus
      - Sitatunga, Tragelaphus spekii
      - Greater kudu, Tragelaphus strepsiceros
  - Subfamily: Cephalophinae
    - Genus: Cephalophus
      - Blue duiker, Cephalophus monticola
      - Red forest duiker, Cephalophus natalensis
    - Genus: Sylvicapra
      - Common duiker, Sylvicapra grimmia
  - Subfamily: Hippotraginae
    - Genus: Hippotragus
      - Roan antelope, Hippotragus equinus
      - Sable antelope, Hippotragus niger
  - Subfamily: Aepycerotinae
    - Genus: Aepyceros
      - Impala, Aepyceros melampus
  - Subfamily: Reduncinae
    - Genus: Kobus
      - Waterbuck, Kobus ellipsiprymnus
    - Genus: Redunca
      - Southern reedbuck, Redunca arundinum
      - Mountain reedbuck, Redunca fulvorufula LC

== See also ==
- List of chordate orders
- Lists of mammals by region
- List of prehistoric mammals
- Mammal classification
- List of mammals described in the 2000s
