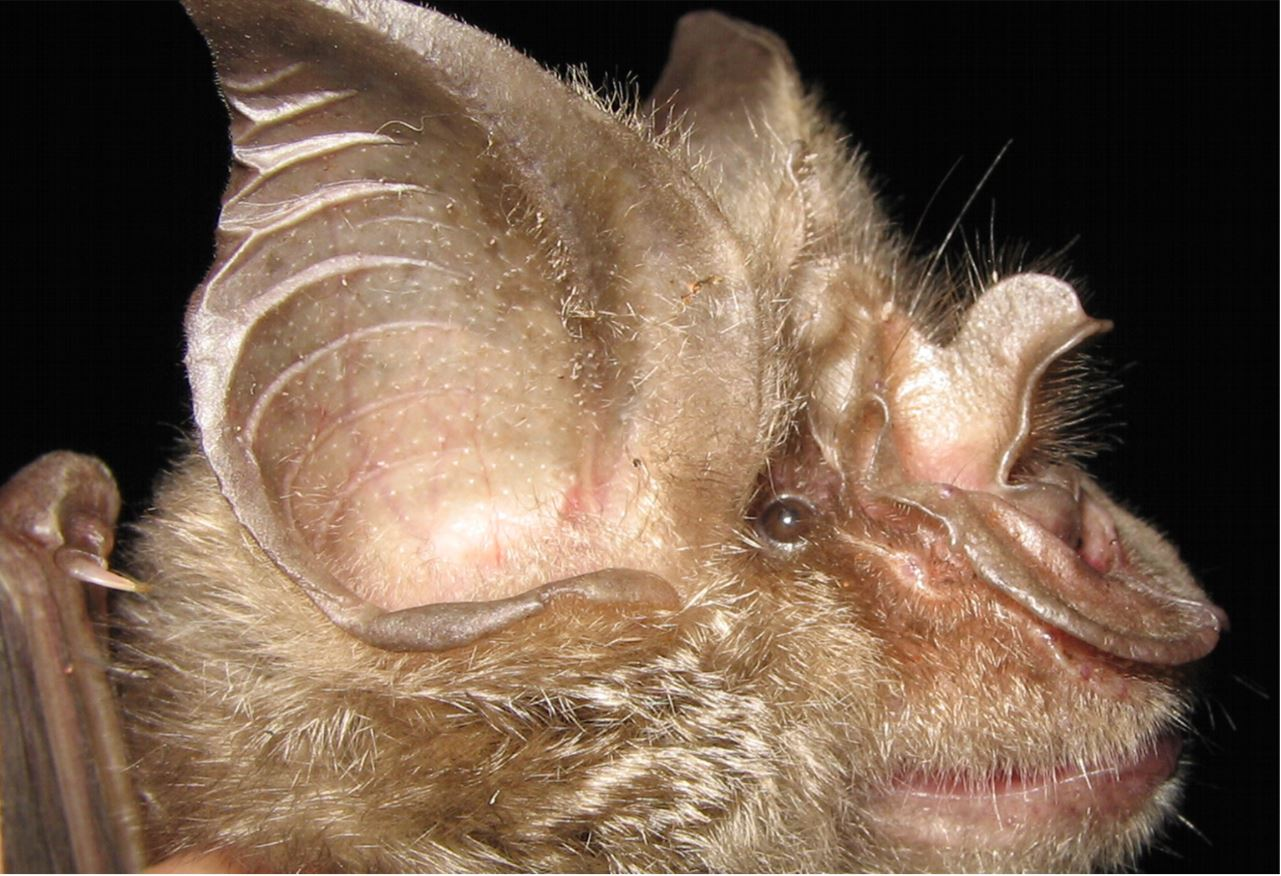

Conservation status
- Least Concern (IUCN 3.1)

Scientific classification
- Kingdom: Animalia
- Phylum: Chordata
- Class: Mammalia
- Order: Chiroptera
- Family: Rhinolophidae
- Genus: Rhinolophus
- Species: R. mossambicus

Binomial name
- Rhinolophus mossambicus Taylor, Stoffberg, Monadjem, Schoeman, Bayliss & Cotterill, 2012

= Mozambican horseshoe bat =

Species of bat

The Mozambican horseshoe bat (Rhinolophus mossambicus) is a species of horseshoe bat found in southern Africa.

== Taxonomy ==
It was described as a new species in 2012. The holotype had been collected by A. Monadjem in July 2006 at Niassa Reserve in Mozambique. It was segregated from the Hildebrandt's horseshoe bat (R. hildebrandtii) species complex at the same time as the Smithers's horseshoe bat, Cohen's horseshoe bat, and Rhinolophus mabuensis. Its species name "mossambicus" refers to the country of Mozambique.

== Description ==
Its forearm length is 60–65 mm (2.4–2.6 in). It echolocates at a peak frequency of 35-38 kHz.

== Range and habitat ==
Its range includes the African countries of Mozambique and Zimbabwe. It has been documented at a range of elevations from 60–1,000 m (200–3,280 ft) above sea level. It is associated with savanna habitats.

== Conservation ==
As of 2017, it is evaluated as a least-concern species by the IUCN. Its population trend is, however, projected as decreasing due to threats, such as hunting for bushmeat, as well as roost disturbance due to guano mining.
