= Mount Mabu horseshoe bat =

Conservation status
- Endangered (IUCN 3.1)

Scientific classification
- Kingdom: Animalia
- Phylum: Chordata
- Class: Mammalia
- Order: Chiroptera
- Family: Rhinolophidae
- Genus: Rhinolophus
- Species: R. mabuensis

Binomial name
- Rhinolophus mabuensis Taylor, Stoffberg, Monadjem, Schoeman, Bayliss & Cotterill, 2012

Species of bat

The Mount Mabu horseshoe bat (Rhinolophus mabuensis) is a species of horseshoe bat. It is endemic to Mozambique.

== Taxonomy ==
The Mount Mabu horseshoe bat was described as a new species in 2012 following analysis of the Hildebrandt's horseshoe bat species complex. Hildebrandt's horseshoe bat was shown via genetic, morphology, and acoustic analysis to actually be five species: four new species were segregated. In addition to the Mount Mabu horseshoe bat, researchers additionally described Cohen's horseshoe bat (R. cohenae), Smithers's horseshoe bat (R. smithersi), and the Mozambican horseshoe bat (R. mossambicus). The holotype for the Mount Mabu horseshoe bat had been collected on Mount Mabu in October 2008.

== Range and habitat ==
As of 2019, the species has only been documented at two sites in northern Mozambique: Mount Mabu and Mount Inago. All specimens collected as of 2012 were found in montane forests or submontane forests.

== Conservation ==
As of 2019, it is evaluated as an endangered species by the IUCN. The IUCN referred to the loss and degradation of its forest habitats as "alarming".
