= Ara Monadjem =

- Born: 19 December 1968 (age 57); Innsbruck, Austria
- Education: University of the Witwatersrand; University of KwaZulu-Natal
- Known for: Research on African mammals and bats
- Scientific career
- Fields: Zoology, mammalogy, ornithology
- Workplaces: University of Eswatini; University of Pretoria

Ara Monadjem (born 19 December 1968) is an Austrian-born Eswatini zoologist and cyclist. His research focuses on African small mammals, particularly bats and rodents.

== Biography ==
Monadjem is the son of Siamak Monadjem and his wife Farideh, née Seddigh. He received a Bachelor of Science degree with honours in 1991 and a Master of Science degree in 1993 from the University of the Witwatersrand in Johannesburg, South Africa. Beginning in 1995, he studied zoology at the University of KwaZulu-Natal, where he earned a PhD in 1997. His doctoral dissertation was titled An Experimental Investigation of the Effects of Supplementary Food and Ground Cover on Small Mammal Population Dynamics and Community Structure in a Swaziland Grassland.

From January 1999 to January 2006, Monadjem was a lecturer at the University of Eswatini, then known as the University of Swaziland. From April 2006 to April 2011, he was an associate professor in its Department of Biology. Since May 2010, he has also worked as a research scientist at the Mammal Research Institute of the University of Pretoria. He has served as a professor at the University of Eswatini since April 2012.

Monadjem's research interests include the ecology and conservation biology of African mammals and birds. His work focuses particularly on small mammals, especially bats and rodents, as well as large birds such as vultures, eagles and storks. He conducts field studies to gather information about rare and threatened species and to improve their identification. His research also includes predictive species-distribution modelling and studies of population dynamics. His fieldwork has taken him to several African countries, including Liberia, Sierra Leone, Uganda, Mozambique, Eswatini, Kenya, Tanzania, Namibia, South Africa and Angola.

In 2012, Monadjem was among the authors who described four bat species in the Rhinolophus hildebrandtii species complex: Rhinolophus smithersi, Rhinolophus mossambicus, Rhinolophus cohenae and Rhinolophus mabuensis. Their study, published in PLOS ONE, examined the evolutionary divergence of these bats across the Afromontane region.

In 2013, Monadjem contributed to species accounts covering the rodent families Nesomyidae and Muridae in the reference work Mammals of Africa, edited by Jonathan Kingdon and other contributors. That year, he also co-authored the description of Neoromicia roseveari, a bat species discovered in the Nimba Mountains of Liberia. The study documented the diversity of pipistrelle-like bats in a West African rainforest and described the new species.

In 2015, Monadjem co-authored Rodents of Sub-Saharan Africa: A Biogeographic and Taxonomic Synthesis with Christiane Denys, Peter J. Taylor and Fenton P. D. Cotterill. In the same year, he co-authored the description of Neoromicia isabella, a bat species from Guinea, with Jan Decher, Anke Hoffmann, Juliane Schaer, Ryan W. Norris, Blaise Kadjo, Jonas Astrin and Rainer Hutterer. Their research documented bat diversity in the Simandou Range of Guinea and described a new white-winged vespertilionid bat.

In 2017, Monadjem co-authored the chapter on Nesomyidae with Steven M. Goodman in volume 7 of Handbook of the Mammals of the World. In 2018, he contributed the chapter on otter shrews in volume 8 and participated in the description of Rhinolophus gorongosae, a bat species from Mozambique. In 2019, he contributed to chapters on roundleaf bats and slit-faced bats in volume 9 of the same reference series.

In 2025 he was awarded the Royal Society Prize for unwavering dedication to African biodiversity research and conservation.

=== Cycling ===
In 2009 he suffered a makor leg injury in s mountain biking race, and did not race for four years. After these years he changed from mountain biking to road cycling.

In August 2014, Monadjem represented Swaziland in the men's road race at the 2014 Commonwealth Games in Glasgow, Scotland at the age of 45. He did not finish the race. Later years he also competed at the 2015 African Road Championships and at the 2021 Eswatini national championships where he finished in fourth place.

== Selected publications ==
- An Annotated Checklist of the Mammals of Swaziland. Conservation Trust of Swaziland, Manzini, 1997.
- The Mammals of Swaziland. Conservation Trust of Swaziland and Big Game Parks, Mbabane, 1998.
- Threatened Vertebrates of Swaziland: Swaziland Red Data Book: Fishes, Amphibians, Reptiles, Birds and Mammals. With Richard Charlton Boycott, Vincent Parker and James Culverwell. Ministry of Tourism, Environment and Communication, Mbabane, 2003.
- Proceedings of the 11th Pan-African Ornithological Congress: 20–25 November 2004, Djerba, Tunisia. 2007.
- Bats of Southern and Central Africa: A Biogeographic and Taxonomic Synthesis. With Peter J. Taylor, Fenton P. D. Cotterill and Martinus Corrie Schoeman. Witwatersrand University Press, 2010. Second edition, 2013. ISBN 1-86814-508-5.
- Rodents of Sub-Saharan Africa: A Biogeographic and Taxonomic Synthesis. With Christiane Denys, Peter J. Taylor and Fenton P. D. Cotterill. De Gruyter, 2015. ISBN 3-11-030166-0.
- African Ark: Mammals, Landscape and the Ecology of a Continent. With Mike Unwin. Wits University Press, 2023. ISBN 978-1-77-614780-9.
