= Kityo's serotine =

Conservation status
- Endangered (IUCN 3.1)

Scientific classification
- Kingdom: Animalia
- Phylum: Chordata
- Class: Mammalia
- Order: Chiroptera
- Family: Vespertilionidae
- Genus: Pseudoromicia
- Species: P. kityoi

Binomial name
- Pseudoromicia kityoi Monadjem, Kerbis Peterhans, Nalikka, Waswa, Demos & B.D. Patterson, 2020

Species of bat

Kityo's serotine (Pseudoromicia kityoi) is an endangered species of vesper bat found in Uganda.

== Taxonomy ==
Kityo's serotine was described as a new species in 2020. The holotype, an adult male, was collected in Mabira Forest in Uganda. The eponym for the species name kityoi is Robert M. Kityo, mammalogist and curator at Makerere University.

== Description ==
Kityo's serotine is the largest member of the genus Pseudoromicia, with forearm lengths of around 37–38 mm (1.5–1.5 in). The fur of its back is brown, with its belly fur somewhat paler. Unlike some white-winged members of its genus, it has dark brown flight membranes. Its dental formula is 2.1.1.23.1.3.3.

== Range ==
Kityo's serotine is likely endemic to Uganda, where it has only been documented near Mabira Forest Reserve.

== Conservation ==
Kityo's serotine is considered an endangered species by the International Union for Conservation of Nature. Only two individuals have been encountered so far. Its range appears restricted to a single forest, and this forest is subject to deforestation to create agricultural fields and produce charcoal.
