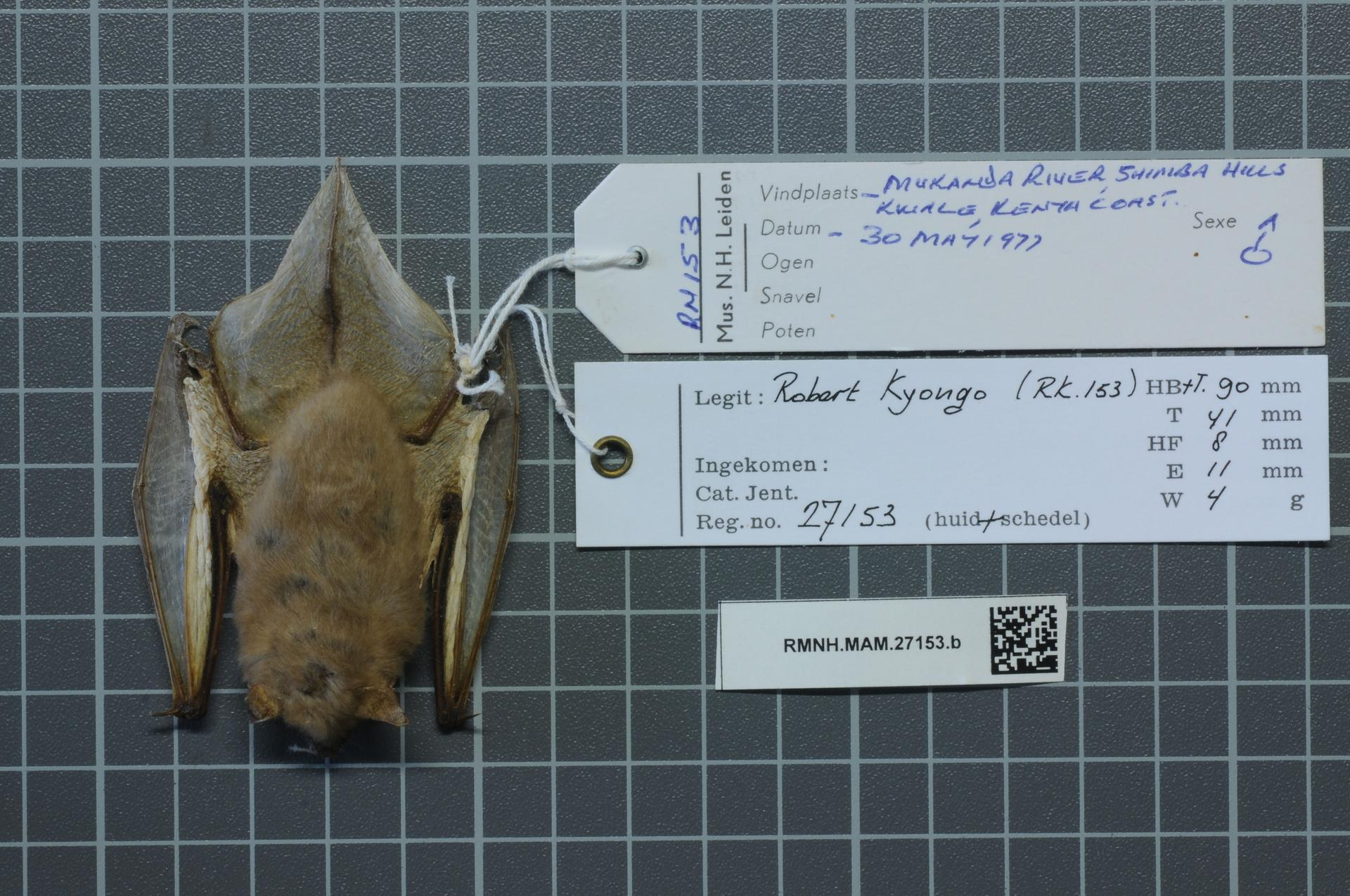
- Rendall's serotine (P. rendalli)

Scientific classification
- Kingdom: Animalia
- Phylum: Chordata
- Class: Mammalia
- Order: Chiroptera
- Family: Vespertilionidae
- Tribe: Vespertilionini
- Genus: Pseudoromicia; Monadjem, Patterson, Webala & Demos, 2020

Species
- See text

= Pseudoromicia =

Genus of bats

Pseudoromicia is a genus of vesper bat in the family Vespertilionidae. All species in this genus are native to sub-Saharan Africa.

It contains the following species:

- Dark-brown serotine, Pseudoromicia brunnea
- Isabelline white-winged serotine, Pseudoromicia isabella
- Kityo's serotine, Pseudoromicia kityoi
- Mbam Minkom serotine, Pseudoromicia mbamminkom
- Nyanza serotine, Pseudoromicia nyanza
- Rendall's serotine, Pseudoromicia rendalli
- Rosevear's serotine, Pseudoromicia roseveari
- White-winged serotine, Pseudoromicia tenuipinnis

All species in this genus were previously classified in the genus Neoromicia until a 2020 study found them to form a distinct genus sister to Afronycteris, and they were thus reclassified in the new genus Pseudoromicia.
