= Isabelline white-winged serotine =

Conservation status
- Data Deficient (IUCN 3.1)

Scientific classification
- Kingdom: Animalia
- Phylum: Chordata
- Class: Mammalia
- Order: Chiroptera
- Family: Vespertilionidae
- Genus: Pseudoromicia
- Species: P. isabella

Binomial name
- Pseudoromicia isabella Hutterer & Monadjem, 2015

Species of bat

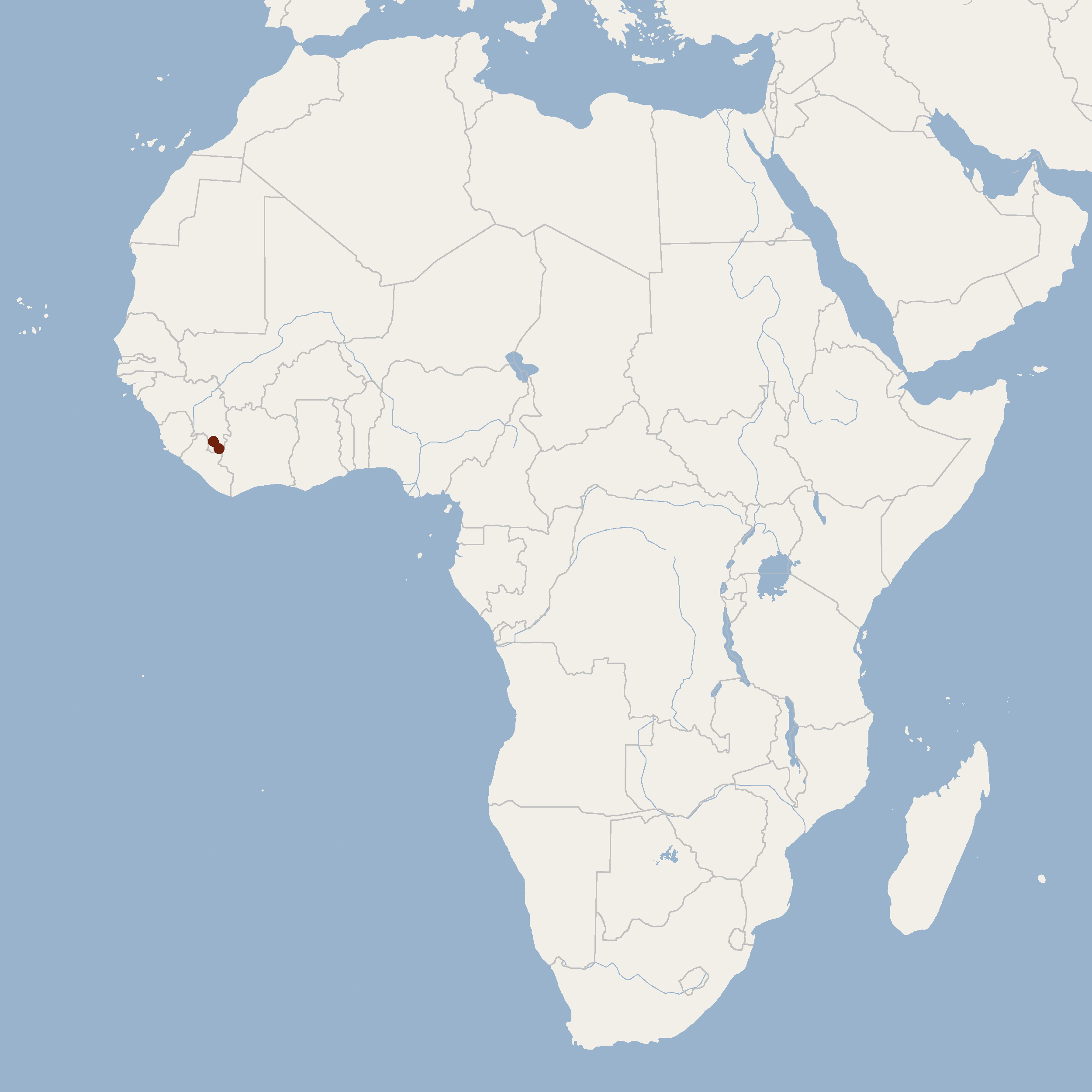
Distribution of Neoromicia isabella

The isabelline white-winged serotine (Pseudoromicia isabella) is a species of West African bat belonging to the genus Neoromicia. It is found in Guinea.

== Taxonomy ==
The isabelline white-winged serotine was described as a new species in 2015 by Decher, Huttere and Monadjem. The holotype had been collected in the Simandou range of Guinea at an elevation of 765 m (2,510 ft) above sea level in 2008. Its species name "isabella" refers to the color isabelline, which is a creamy brown. It refers to the coloration of the bat's dorsal fur, in addition to being the given name of Decher's daughter Isabelle.

== Description ==
The isabelline white-winged serotine has a total length of 80 mm (3.1 in) and weighs around 5.5 g (0.19 oz). It has a forearm length of about 31.7 mm (1.25 in). The flight membranes, tail membrane and the fur of the belly are white, along with the ears, lips and feet which are slightly off white. The hairs on the back are light orange-brown. This coloration differentiates it from other species of West African bats.

== Distribution and habitat ==
This species occurs in upper Guinea. So far, its known distribution is limited to the Guinee Forestiere Region of Guinea and the Liberian side of the Mount Nimba range. It is thought to inhabit subtropical and tropical forests and lowlands.

== Conservation and threats ==
The species is listed as data deficient in the IUCN Red List due to lack of knowledge about its population. However, it is thought to be threatened by habitat loss caused by agriculture and iron ore mining, both of which occur in its known geographical range.
