= White-winged serotine =

Conservation status
- Least Concern (IUCN 3.1)

Scientific classification
- Domain: Eukaryota
- Kingdom: Animalia
- Phylum: Chordata
- Class: Mammalia
- Order: Chiroptera
- Family: Vespertilionidae
- Genus: Pseudoromicia
- Species: P. tenuipinnis

Binomial name
- Pseudoromicia tenuipinnis (Peters, 1872)

Synonyms
- Eptesicus tenuipinnis (Peters, 1872); Neoromicia tenuipinnis

Species of bat

The white-winged serotine (Pseudoromicia tenuipinnis) is a species of vesper bat.

It can be found in the following countries: Angola, Burundi, Cameroon, Republic of the Congo, Democratic Republic of the Congo, Ivory Coast, Equatorial Guinea, Ethiopia, Gabon, Gambia, Ghana, Guinea, Guinea-Bissau, Kenya, Liberia, Nigeria, Rwanda, Senegal, Sierra Leone, Tanzania, and Uganda. It is found in subtropical or tropical forests and moist savanna.
