= Rosevear's serotine =

Conservation status
- Endangered (IUCN 3.1)

Scientific classification
- Domain: Eukaryota
- Kingdom: Animalia
- Phylum: Chordata
- Class: Mammalia
- Order: Chiroptera
- Family: Vespertilionidae
- Genus: Pseudoromicia
- Species: P. roseveari

Binomial name
- Pseudoromicia roseveari (Monadjem, Richards, Taylor & Stoffberg, 2013)

Synonyms
- Neoromicia roseveari

Species of bat

Rosevear's serotine (Pseudoromicia roseveari) is a species of vesper bat that lives in Guinea and Liberia. It was described as a new species in 2013. It is listed as endangered by the IUCN.

== Taxonomy and etymology ==
It was described in 2013. Its closest relative is the dark-brown serotine, Pseudoromicia brunnea. Rosevear's serotine and the dark-brown serotine are separated by a genetic distance of 6.9–7.2%. The new species was assigned to the genus Neoromicia based on its single upper premolar: a trait shared amongst all species in the genus. The authors who described the species chose the specific epithet "roseveari" to honor Donovan Reginald Rosevear, "who made a significant contribution to West African bat research in the 20th century, culminating in his book The Bats of West Africa".

Although initially described in the genus Neoromicia, a 2020 study found it to belong to a separate genus, described as Pseudoromicia.

== Description ==
It is a small bat, with a total body length of 89–91 mm (3.5–3.6 in). Its tail is 39–44 mm (1.5–1.7 in); its forearm is 37 mm (1.5 in) long; its hindfoot is 8 mm (0.31 in) long; its ear length is 13–14 mm (0.51–0.55 in). It has a body mass of 6–6.3 g (0.21–0.22 oz). Its maximum skull length is 14.36–14.47 mm (0.565–0.570 in). Despite this small size, it is the largest "pipistrelloid" (bats in the genera Afronycteris, Pseudoromicia, Laephotis, Hypsugo, Neoromicia, and Pipistrellus) in West Africa. In some aspects, Eisentraut's serotine overlaps with Rosevear's serotine in size, though they can be differentiated by their morphology. Its fur is dark chocolate brown in color. The fur on its ventral surface is bicolored, with the bases of individual hairs darker than their tips. The fur on its dorsal surface is a constant color throughout, in contrast to the bicolored ventral fur. Its ear is relatively short, and rounded at the tip. The outer edge of the tragus is curved; the base of the tragus has a "distinct lobe." Relative to other species in its genus, it has a robust skull and a broad snout. Its dental formula, typical for Pseudoromicia species, is 2.1.1.23.1.3.3, for a total of 32 teeth.

== Biology ==
As only six individuals have ever been encountered, very little is known about the biology of this species. A female captured in Guinea in early March 2008 was pregnant, however, with a fetus 20 mm (0.79 in) from crown to rump.

== Range and habitat ==
Only six specimens have ever been documented. Four specimens were recorded on the Liberian border of Mount Nimba and the other two specimens were in the Simandou Range of Guinea. All captured individuals were netted over small streams in primary rainforest. Two of the Mount Nimba individuals were encountered at 450–550 m (1,480–1,800 ft) above sea level.

== Conservation ==
It is currently evaluated as endangered by the IUCN. Major threats to this species include deforestation via slash-and-burn agriculture, logging, and mining.
