= Desert yellow bat =

Conservation status
- Least Concern (IUCN 3.1)

Scientific classification
- Kingdom: Animalia
- Phylum: Chordata
- Class: Mammalia
- Order: Chiroptera
- Family: Vespertilionidae
- Genus: Scotoecus
- Species: S. pallidus

Binomial name
- Scotoecus pallidus Dobson, 1876

Species of bat

The desert yellow bat (Scotoecus pallidus) is a species of vesper bat. It is found in India, Pakistan, and Bangladesh. Its natural habitats are subtropical or tropical dry forests and shrubland, rural gardens, and urban areas.
