= Scotoecus =

Scientific classification
- Kingdom: Animalia
- Phylum: Chordata
- Class: Mammalia
- Order: Chiroptera
- Family: Vespertilionidae
- Tribe: Pipistrellini
- Genus: Scotoecus; Thomas, 1901

Type species
- Scotophilus albofuscus Thomas, 1890

Genus of bats

Scotoecus is a genus of bats in the family Vespertilionidae.

== Species ==
- Scotoecus albigula - white-bellied lesser house bat
- Scotoecus albofuscus - light-winged lesser house bat
- Scotoecus hindei - Hinde's lesser house bat
- Scotoecus hirundo - dark-winged lesser house bat
- Scotoecus pallidus - desert yellow bat
