= Dark-brown serotine =

Conservation status
- Near Threatened (IUCN 3.1)

Scientific classification
- Kingdom: Animalia
- Phylum: Chordata
- Class: Mammalia
- Order: Chiroptera
- Family: Vespertilionidae
- Genus: Pseudoromicia
- Species: P. brunnea

Binomial name
- Pseudoromicia brunnea (Thomas, 1880)

Synonyms
- Vesperugo brunneus Thomas 1880; Pipistrellus brunneus Hill & Harrison 1987; Nycterikaupius brunneus Menu 1987; Eptesicus brunneus Koopman 1994; Neoromicia brunneus Simmons 2005; Neoromicia brunnea

Species of bat

The dark-brown serotine (Pseudoromicia brunnea) is a species of vesper bat found in Central and West Africa.

== Taxonomy and etymology ==
It was described as a new species in 1880 by British zoologist Oldfield Thomas. He described the species based on individuals collected by Robb in Old Calabar, Nigeria. Thomas initially placed the new species in the now-defunct genus Vesperugo, subgenus Vesperus (also defunct). Its first binomial name was Vesperugo brunneus. The species name "brunneus" is Latin for "brown". This likely refers to its fur color. In his description of the species, Thomas hypothesized that it was closely related to the Cape serotine, Neoromicia capensis (formerly Vesperugo capensis). In 2020, the species was reclassified in the new genus Pseudoromicia based on phylogenetic studies.

== Description ==
Thomas described this species as dark brown, with short ears and a well-developed calcar on the uropatagium. Its tragus is "medium length", straight, and has a flat tip. Its head and body is 1.8 in (46 mm) long; its tail is 1.35 in (34 mm) long; its ear is 0.55 in (14 mm) long; its tragus is 0.2 in (5.1 mm) long. Its forearm is 33–38 mm (1.3–1.5 in) long. Its wing membranes are blackish-brown in color. Its dental formula is 2.1.1.33.1.2.3 for a total of 32 teeth.

== Biology ==
Females give birth to one pup at a time. It is parasitized by at least one species of bat fly, Basilia echinata.

== Range and habitat ==
This species is found in several countries in West and Central Africa, including Cameroon, Congo, Côte d'Ivoire, Equatorial Guinea, Gabon, Ghana, Liberia, Nigeria, and Sierra Leone. It is known as a rainforest specialist. It is usually found at low altitudes, but has been recorded at elevations up to 1,470 m (4,820 ft) above sea level.

== Conservation ==
It is evaluated as near threatened by the IUCN. It meets the criteria for this designation because its population is likely in significant decline, but the decline is probably not greater than 30% over 10 years. There is also widespread habitat loss throughout its known range. The IUCN notes that the species is close to qualifying for vulnerable status. Specific threats to this species include deforestation for timber harvest and Conversion to farmland.
