= White-bellied lesser house bat =

Scientific classification
- Kingdom: Animalia
- Phylum: Chordata
- Class: Mammalia
- Order: Chiroptera
- Family: Vespertilionidae
- Genus: Scotoecus
- Species: S. albigula

Binomial name
- Scotoecus albigula Thomas, 1909

Species of bat

The white-bellied lesser house bat (Scotoecus albigula) is a species of vesper bat. It can be found in Angola, Kenya, Malawi, Mozambique, Somalia, Uganda, and Zambia.
