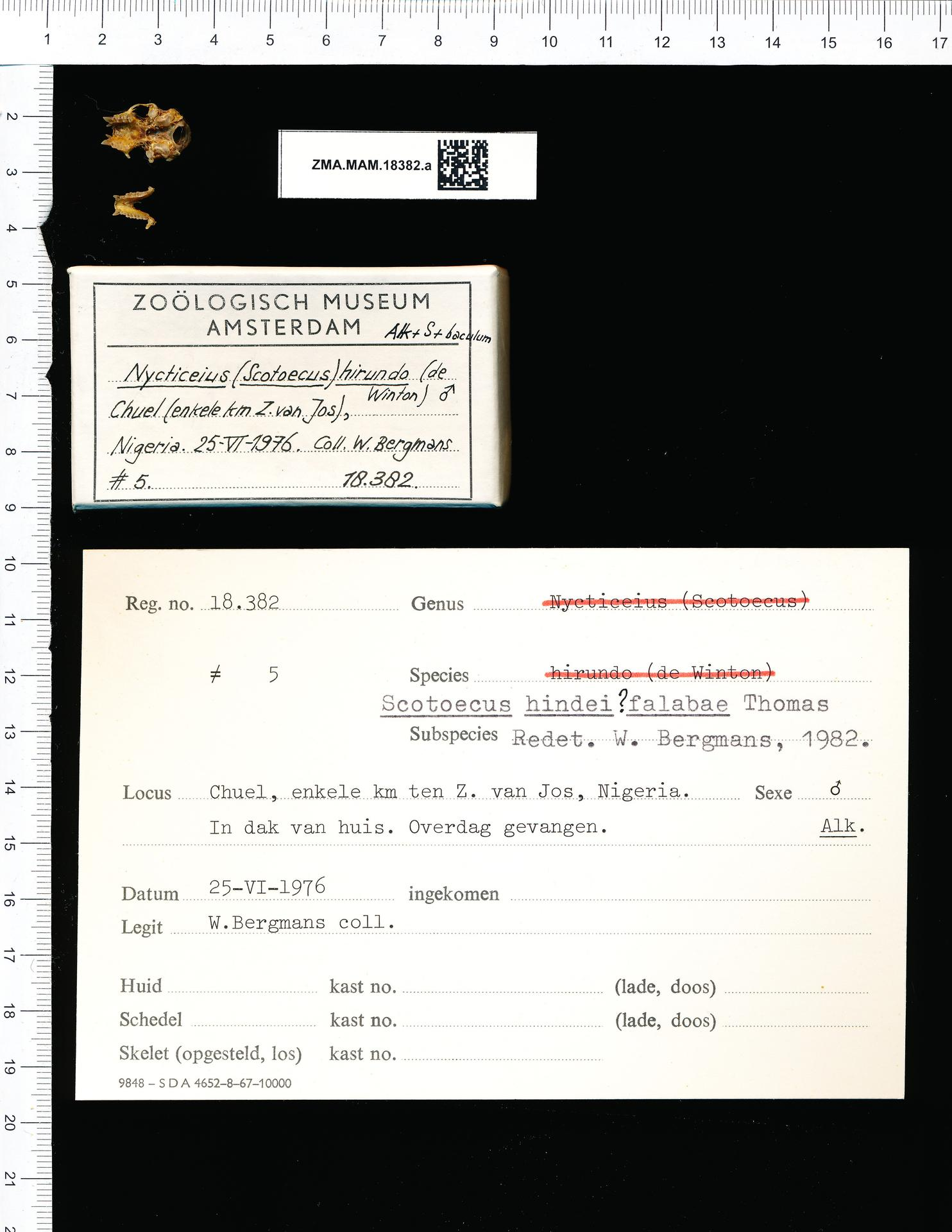
- skull of Scotoecus hirundo

Conservation status
- Least Concern (IUCN 3.1)

Scientific classification
- Kingdom: Animalia
- Phylum: Chordata
- Class: Mammalia
- Order: Chiroptera
- Family: Vespertilionidae
- Genus: Scotoecus
- Species: S. hirundo

Binomial name
- Scotoecus hirundo de Winton, 1899

= Dark-winged lesser house bat =

Species of bat

The dark-winged lesser house bat (Scotoecus hirundo) is a species of vesper bat. It can be found in Angola, Benin, Cameroon, Central African Republic, Chad, Democratic Republic of the Congo, Republic of Côte d'Ivoire, Ethiopia, Gambia, Ghana, Guinea, Kenya, Malawi, Mozambique, Nigeria, Senegal, Sierra Leone, Somalia, Sudan, Tanzania, Uganda, and Zambia.
