= Arends's golden mole =

Arends' golden mole

Conservation status
- Vulnerable (IUCN 3.1)

Scientific classification
- Kingdom: Animalia
- Phylum: Chordata
- Class: Mammalia
- Order: Afrosoricida
- Family: Chrysochloridae
- Genus: Carpitalpa; Lundholm, 1955
- Species: C. arendsi

Binomial name
- Carpitalpa arendsi (Lundholm, 1955)
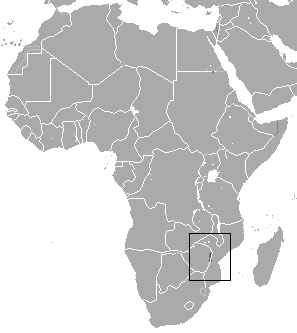
- Arends' golden mole range

Synonyms
- Chlorotalpa arendsi Lundholm, 1955

Species of mammal

Arends' golden mole (Carpitalpa arendsi) is a species of mammal in the family Chrysochloridae. It is the only species in the genus Carpitalpa.

== Description ==
Carpitalpa arendsi is a moderately sized species of golden mole. Its body length ranges between 11.5 and 14 cm (4.5 and 5.5 in). Adult males are heavier than females, averaging just over 50 g (1.8 oz), while females usually weigh a little over 40 g (1.4 oz). The fur on its upper body is dark and glossy, appearing black or deep brown with a metallic bronze tint. Lighter coloring is found on the legs, throat, and along the sides of the face. The belly has a slightly lighter color than the rest of the body and shows a subtle greenish shine. This species is blind and has vestigial eyes covered by a thick layer of skin.

Its forelimbs are shaped for digging. The claw on the first toe is small but thick. The second toe is noticeably shorter than the third. The fourth toe is significantly smaller and vestigial.

Like other golden moles, Arends' golden mole lacks a visible external tail and has tough, loosely attached skin that helps it move through soil.

The Arends' golden mole differs from other members of the genus Chlorotalpa mainly in skull and tooth features. These include a more expanded malleus bone in the middle ear, a stronger stylohyal bone, a longer roof of the mouth, and the absence of fully developed molar talonids.

== Distribution and habitat ==
Carpitalpa arendsi is found in Mozambique and Zimbabwe, where its range is largely narrowed down to the Inyanga Highlands, with a small extension into the adjacent Vila Perey district. Its natural habitats include high-elevation of up to 4,000 m (13,000 ft) in altitude, grasslands and forested areas along streams and rivers with dense ground cover and leaf litter. The species is found in temperate and subtropical forests, dry and moist mountainous forests, lowland grasslands, and human-altered areas such as agricultural land, pastures, plantations, rural gardens, and urban areas.

The species shows a preference for fine, well-drained soils, where it builds tunnels beneath coarse grass. Individuals are occasionally seen moving across the ground surface after rainfall.

== Behavior ==
Like other golden moles, Carpitalpa arendsi is adapted to burrowing, spending most of its life underground. It moves through soil using its strong forelimb and snout, which helps push through and excavate tunnels. It is active at different times throughout the day and night, though its activity levels may decrease during colder conditions. Burrow depth differs among golden mole species, with tunnels ranging from near-surface to deep burrows, likely influenced by soil conditions.

This species is capable of navigating effectively underground and can return to tunnel openings after moving through its environment. It feeds on small invertebrates, like worms, and insects found in the soil and along the surface after it rains. When in contact with predators or humans, it typically avoids confrontation and will attempt to escape rather than bite.

Arends' golden mole is typically polygynous and tends to breed during the winter months, from April to July. The mating pursuit involves vocal sounds and the male chasing the female. Pregnancy lasts four to six weeks and there are two to three young in a litter. They are taken care of and fed by the female in the burrow for two to three months until she evicts them.

== Conservation status ==
The conservation status of Arends' golden mole was last reviewed in 2014 by the IUCN Red List of Threatened Species, which categorizes the species as Vulnerable. The species is believed to be threatened by human-related changes to its habitat in Zimbabwe. This includes changes associated with political instability and poorly regulated land-use and conservation management. In addition, an increase in the occurrence and severity of wildfires, unregulated timber extraction, and intensive grazing by domestic livestock are also expected threats. Predation by domestic cats and dogs is also considered a potential threat, primarily at a local level due to the species' common occurrence in cultivated lands and gardens.

This species causes disturbance in cultivated plots and grass lawns with its burrowing. Many are killed for being seen as pests, while others are skinned for their fur. However, some farmers favor their presence because they feed on insects.

== Taxonomy ==
Carpitalpa arendsi was first described by Lundholm, who named it for Nicolas Arends, taxidermist at the Kaffrarian Museum (now the Amathole Museum, in King William's Town, South Africa) who captured the specimen. It belongs to the family Chrysochloridae (golden moles). The genus Carpitalpa is placed in the subfamily Amblysominae. It is the only species in the genus Carpitalpa, though it was previously placed in the genus Chlorotalpa.
