= Light-winged lesser house bat =

Conservation status
- Data Deficient (IUCN 3.1)

Scientific classification
- Kingdom: Animalia
- Phylum: Chordata
- Class: Mammalia
- Order: Chiroptera
- Family: Vespertilionidae
- Genus: Scotoecus
- Species: S. albofuscus

Binomial name
- Scotoecus albofuscus Thomas, 1890

Species of bat

The light-winged lesser house bat (Scotoecus albofuscus) is a species of vesper bat. It can be found in Benin, Democratic Republic of the Congo, Ivory Coast, Gambia, Ghana, Kenya, Malawi, Mozambique, Nigeria, Senegal, Sierra Leone, South Africa, South Sudan, Tanzania, and Uganda. It is found in dry savanna.
