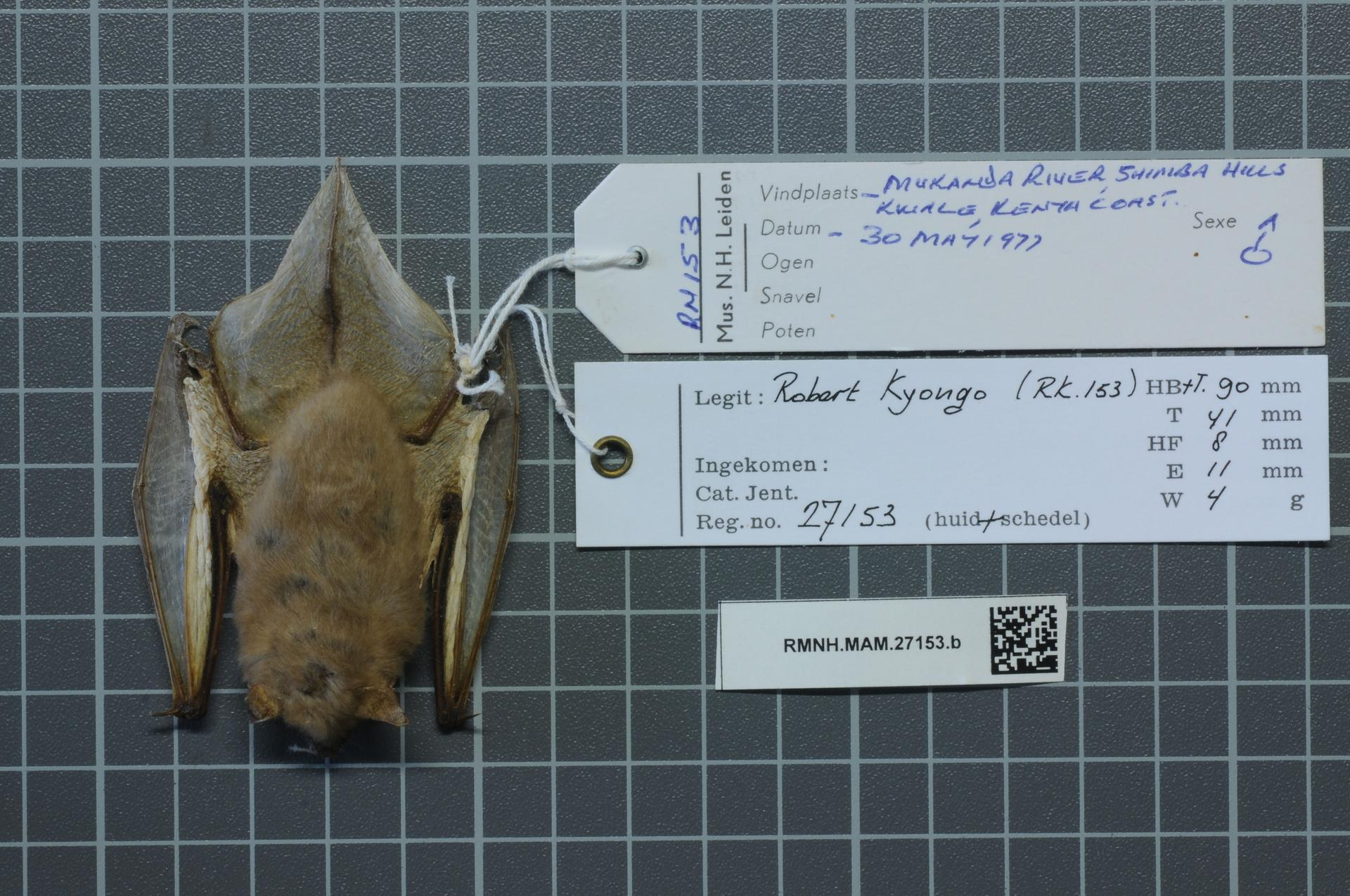

Conservation status
- Least Concern (IUCN 3.1)

Scientific classification
- Domain: Eukaryota
- Kingdom: Animalia
- Phylum: Chordata
- Class: Mammalia
- Order: Chiroptera
- Family: Vespertilionidae
- Genus: Pseudoromicia
- Species: P. rendalli

Binomial name
- Pseudoromicia rendalli (Thomas, 1889)

Synonyms
- Vesperugo (Vesperus) rendalli Thomas, 1889; Eptesicus rendalli (Thomas, 1889); Neoromicia rendalli

= Rendall's serotine =

Species of bat

Rendall's serotine (Pseudoromicia rendalli) is a species of vesper bat. It is found in Benin, Botswana, Burkina Faso, Cameroon, Central African Republic, Chad, Republic of the Congo, Democratic Republic of the Congo, Gambia, Ghana, Kenya, Malawi, Mali, Mozambique, Niger, Nigeria, Rwanda, Senegal, Sierra Leone, Somalia, South Africa, Sudan, Tanzania, Uganda, and Zambia. Its natural habitats are savanna and subtropical or tropical shrubland,. It is threatened by habitat loss.

The species was first described in 1889 as Vesperago Rendalli by Oldfield Thomas, based on a specimen collected by dr. Percy Rendall at Bathurst, on the river Gambia.
