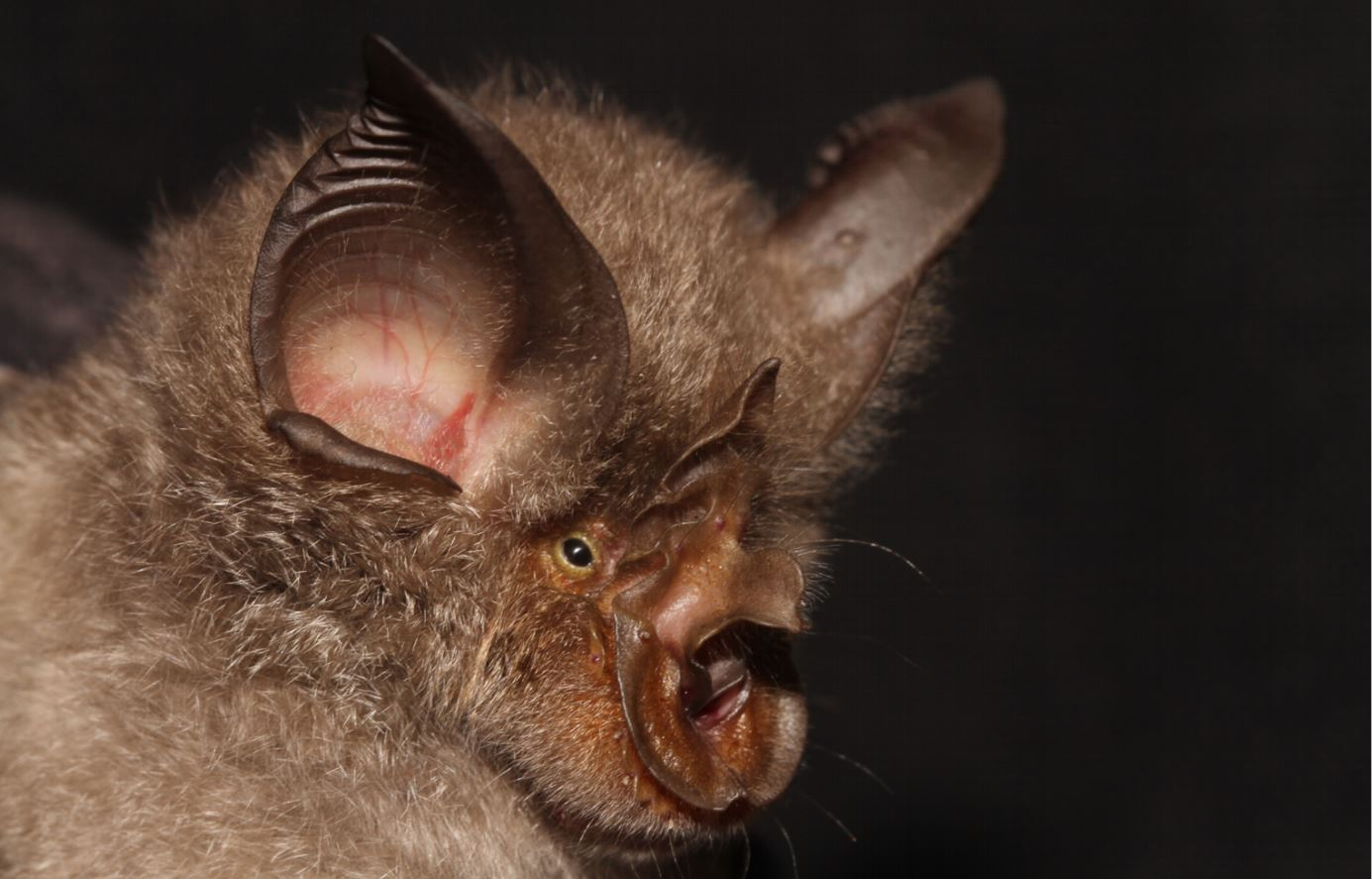

Conservation status
- Near Threatened (IUCN 3.1)

Scientific classification
- Kingdom: Animalia
- Phylum: Chordata
- Class: Mammalia
- Order: Chiroptera
- Family: Rhinolophidae
- Genus: Rhinolophus
- Species: R. smithersi

Binomial name
- Rhinolophus smithersi Taylor, Stoffberg, Monadjem, Schoeman, Bayliss & Cotterill, 2012

= Smithers's horseshoe bat =

Species of bat

Smithers's horseshoe bat (Rhinolophus smithersi) is a species of horseshoe bat found in South Africa and Zimbabwe. It was described as a new species in 2012.

== Taxonomy and etymology ==
Smithers's horseshoe bat was described as a new species in 2012. It was described as a result of a taxonomic split in the Hildebrandt's horseshoe bat (R. hildebrandtii). The holotype—an adult female—was collected in October 2000 in the Gokwe region of Zimbabwe. Its species name "smithersi" was chosen to honor Reay Henry Noble Smithers, former Director of the National Museums of Zimbabwe.

== Description ==
This species can be differentiated from sympatric members of its genus by its high echolocation frequencies, small cranium, and wide nose-leaf. Its mean echolocation frequency is 40–46 kHz. The forearm length of the holotype is 60.7 mm (2.39 in). Its nose-leaf is 10–14 mm (0.39–0.55 in) wide. The sella has long hairs and narrows at its tip. The lancet is relatively long and straight. The fur of its back is grayish-brown, with individual hairs long. Its ventral surface is paler than its back.

== Range and habitat ==
This species is known from one individual in Zimbabwe and 19 sites in South Africa. During the day, it roosts in natural or man-made underground cavities.

== Conservation ==
It is currently evaluated as near threatened by the IUCN. Its population size is thought to be small, perhaps fewer than 1,000 individuals. The population in South Africa occurs in two biosphere reserves, Vhembe Biosphere Reserve and Waterberg Biosphere Reserve.
