= Hildebrandt's horseshoe bat =

Conservation status
- Least Concern (IUCN 3.1)

Scientific classification
- Kingdom: Animalia
- Phylum: Chordata
- Class: Mammalia
- Order: Chiroptera
- Family: Rhinolophidae
- Genus: Rhinolophus
- Species: R. hildebrandtii

Binomial name
- Rhinolophus hildebrandtii Peters, 1878
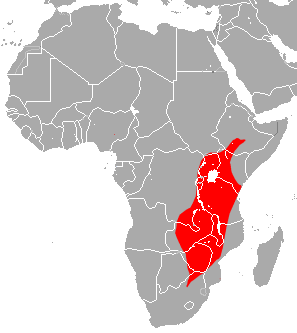
- Hildebrandt's horseshoe bat range

Species of bat

Hildebrandt's horseshoe bat (Rhinolophus hildebrandtii) is a species of bat in the family Rhinolophidae found in Africa. Its natural habitats are savanna, caves and other subterranean habitats.
