= List of gerbillines =

Species in mammal subfamily Gerbillinae

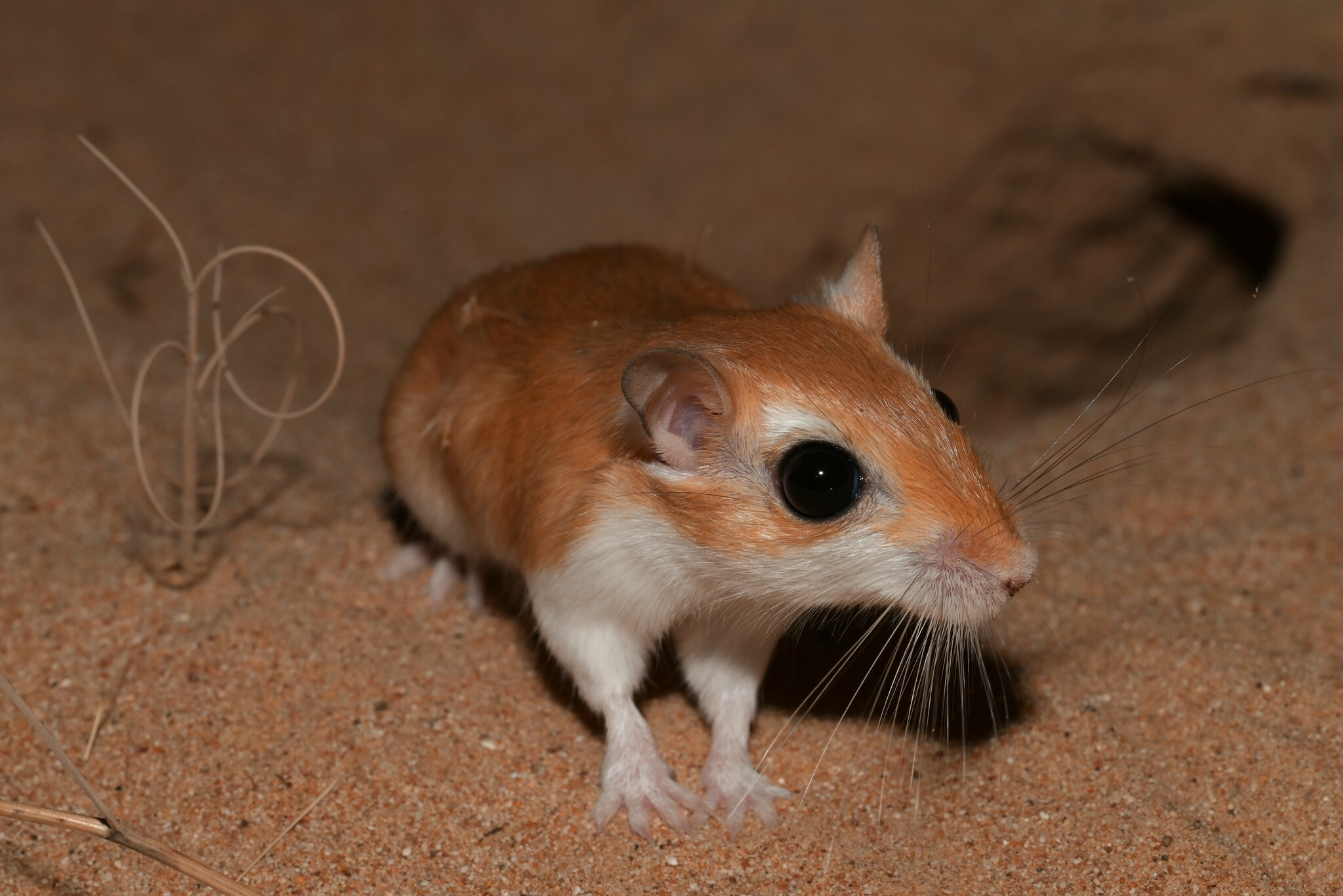
Cheesman's gerbil (Gerbillus cheesmani)

Gerbillinae is a subfamily of mammals in the rodent family Muridae, which in turn is part of the Myomorpha suborder in the order Rodentia. Members of this subfamily are called gerbillines and include gerbils, jirds, and sand rats. They are found in Africa and Asia, primarily in shrublands, grasslands, savannas, and deserts, though some species can be found in forests and coastal areas. They range in size from the pouched gerbil, at 5 cm (2 in) plus a 3 cm (1 in) tail, to the large Aden gerbil, at 22 cm (9 in) plus a 11 cm (4 in) tail. Gerbillines generally eat seeds, roots, nuts, grass, and insects, as well as grain and other vegetation. Few gerbillines have population estimates, but the western gerbil is categorized as endangered, and Dahl's jird is categorized as critically endangered, with a population of below 2,000.

The 102 extant species of Gerbillinae are divided into 14 genera, with 49—nearly half—in the Gerbillus genus. The Mongolian gerbil, as well as some other species such as the fat-tailed gerbil, are kept as pets. Several extinct prehistoric gerbilline species have been discovered, though due to ongoing research and discoveries, the exact number and categorization are not fixed.

== Conventions ==
IUCN Red List categories
Conservation status
- EX: Extinct (0 species)
- EW: Extinct in the wild (0 species)
- CR: Critically endangered (1 species)
- EN: Endangered (1 species)
- VU: Vulnerable (2 species)
- NT: Near threatened (0 species)
- LC: Least concern (74 species)

Other categories
- DD: Data deficient (19 species)
- NE: Not evaluated (5 species)

The author citation for the species or genus is given after the scientific name; parentheses around the author citation indicate that this was not the original taxonomic placement. Conservation status codes listed follow the International Union for Conservation of Nature (IUCN) Red List of Threatened Species. Range maps are provided wherever possible; if a range map is not available, a description of the gerbilline's range is provided. Ranges are based on the IUCN Red List for that species unless otherwise noted.

== Classification ==
Gerbillinae is a subfamily of the rodent family Muridae consisting of 102 extant species in 14 genera. These genera range in size from 1 to 49 species, with the latter, Gerbillus, making up almost half of the subfamily. This does not include hybrid species or extinct prehistoric species.

Subfamily Gerbillinae

- Genus Ammodillus (ammodile): one species
- Genus Brachiones (Przewalski's gerbil): one species
- Genus Desmodilliscus (pouched gerbil): one species
- Genus Desmodillus (Cape short-eared gerbil): one species
- Genus Gerbilliscus (large naked-soled gerbils): sixteen species
- Genus Gerbillus (northern pygmy gerbils): 49 species
- Genus Meriones (jirds): seventeen species
- Genus Microdillus (Somali pygmy gerbil): one species
- Genus Pachyuromys (fat-tailed gerbil): one species
- Genus Psammomys (sand rats): two species
- Genus Rhombomys (great gerbil): one species
- Genus Sekeetamys (bushy-tailed jird): one species
- Genus Tatera (Indian gerbil): one species
- Genus Taterillus (taterils): nine species

- Gerbillinae
  - - Gerbillini
      - - - - Meriones
            - Rhombomys
          - Psammomys
        - Brachiones
      - - - - Ammodillus
            - Gerbillus
          - Sekeetamys
        - Taterillus
    - Desmodilliscini
      - Desmodilliscus
      - Pachyuromys
  - - Gerbillurini
      - Tatera
      - - Desmodillus
        - Gerbilliscus

== Gerbillines ==
The following classification is based on the taxonomy described by the reference work Mammal Species of the World (2005), with augmentation by generally accepted proposals made since using molecular phylogenetic analysis, as supported by both the IUCN and the American Society of Mammalogists.

Genus Ammodillus – Thomas, 1904 – one species
Common name	Scientific name and subspecies	Range	Size and ecology	IUCN status and estimated population
Ammodile	A. imbellis (De Winton, 1898)	Ethiopia and Somalia	Size: 8–11 cm (3–4 in) long, plus 12–15 cm (5–6 in) tail Habitat: Grassland Diet: Plant material and invertebrates	DD Unknown

Genus Brachiones – Thomas, 1925 – one species
Common name	Scientific name and subspecies	Range	Size and ecology	IUCN status and estimated population
Przewalski's gerbil	B. przewalskii (Büchner, 1889)	Northern China	Size: 6–11 cm (2–4 in) long, plus 5–8 cm (2–3 in) tail Habitat: Desert Diet: Plant material and invertebrates	LC Unknown

Genus Desmodilliscus – Wettstein, 1916 – one species
Common name	Scientific name and subspecies	Range	Size and ecology	IUCN status and estimated population
Pouched gerbil	D. braueri Wettstein, 1916	Western and northern Africa	Size: 5–8 cm (2–3 in) long, plus 3–5 cm (1–2 in) tail Habitat: Savanna Diet: Grain	LC Unknown

Genus Desmodillus – Thomas & Schwann, 1904 – one species
Common name	Scientific name and subspecies	Range	Size and ecology	IUCN status and estimated population
Cape short-eared gerbil	D. auricularis (Smith, 1834)	Southern Africa	Size: 8–13 cm (3–5 in) long, plus 7–10 cm (3–4 in) tail Habitat: Desert Diet: Seeds, grain, and insects	LC Unknown

Genus Gerbilliscus – Thomas, 1897 – sixteen species
Common name	Scientific name and subspecies	Range	Size and ecology	IUCN status and estimated population
Black-tailed gerbil	G. nigricaudus (Peters, 1878)	Eastern Africa	Size: 13–20 cm (5–8 in) long, plus 17–21 cm (7–8 in) tail Habitat: Shrubland, savanna, and forest Diet: Roots, bulbs, seeds, vegetation, and insects	LC Unknown
Boehm's gerbil	G. boehmi (Noack, 1887)	Central Africa	Size: 13–18 cm (5–7 in) long, plus 19–23 cm (7–9 in) tail Habitat: Shrubland and savanna Diet: Roots, bulbs, seeds, vegetation, and insects	LC Unknown
Bushveld gerbil	G. leucogaster (Peters, 1852)	Southern Africa	Size: 8–16 cm (3–6 in) long, plus 12–18 cm (5–7 in) tail Habitat: Grassland, shrubland, savanna, and desert Diet: Roots, bulbs, seeds, vegetation, and insects	LC Unknown
Bushy-tailed hairy-footed gerbil	G. vallinus Thomas, 1918	Namibia and South Africa	Size: 9–11 cm (4–4 in) long, plus 11–16 cm (4–6 in) tail Habitat: Savanna, grassland, and desert Diet: Seeds	LC Unknown
Cape gerbil	G. afra (Gray, 1830)	South Africa	Size: 12–16 cm (5–6 in) long, plus 13–18 cm (5–7 in) tail Habitat: Desert and shrubland Diet: Roots, bulbs, seeds, vegetation, and insects	LC Unknown
Dune hairy-footed gerbil	G. tytonis Bauer & Niethammer, 1960	Namibia	Size: 9–11 cm (4–4 in) long, plus 11–15 cm (4–6 in) tail Habitat: Desert Diet: Seeds	LC Unknown
Fringe-tailed gerbil	G. robustus (Cretzschmar, 1826)	Eastern Africa	Size: 12–19 cm (5–7 in) long, plus 12–21 cm (5–8 in) tail Habitat: Savanna and grassland Diet: Roots, bulbs, seeds, vegetation, and insects	LC Unknown
Gorongoza gerbil	G. inclusus (Thomas & Wroughton, 1908)	Southeastern Africa	Size: 15–17 cm (6–7 in) long, plus 13–20 cm (5–8 in) tail Habitat: Savanna Diet: Roots, bulbs, seeds, vegetation, and insects	LC Unknown
Guinean gerbil	G. guineae (Thomas, 1910)	Western Africa	Size: 10–18 cm (4–7 in) long, plus 15–20 cm (6–8 in) tail Habitat: Savanna, rocky areas, forest, and shrubland Diet: Roots, bulbs, seeds, vegetation, and insects	LC Unknown
Hairy-footed gerbil	G. paeba Smith, 1836	Southern Africa	Size: 8–11 cm (3–4 in) long, plus 10–13 cm (4–5 in) tail Habitat: Savanna, desert, and shrubland Diet: Seeds	LC Unknown
Highveld gerbil	G. brantsii (Smith, 1836)	Southern Africa	Size: 9–17 cm (4–7 in) long, plus 10–19 cm (4–7 in) tail Habitat: Savanna, shrubland, desert, and grassland Diet: Roots, bulbs, seeds, vegetation, and insects	LC Unknown
Kemp's gerbil	G. kempi (Wroughton, 1906)	Western and central Africa	Size: 14–19 cm (6–7 in) long, plus 14–18 cm (6–7 in) tail Habitat: Savanna, forest, and shrubland Diet: Roots, bulbs, seeds, vegetation, and insects	LC Unknown
Namib brush-tailed gerbil	G. setzeri Schlitter, 1973	Namibia and Angola	Size: 10–12 cm (4–5 in) long, plus 11–15 cm (4–6 in) tail Habitat: Desert Diet: Seeds	LC Unknown
Phillips's gerbil	G. phillipsi (De Winton, 1898)	Eastern Africa	Size: 11–15 cm (4–6 in) long, plus 16–19 cm (6–7 in) tail Habitat: Shrubland Diet: Roots, bulbs, seeds, vegetation, and insects	LC Unknown
Sahelo-Sudanian gerbil	G. gambiana Thomas, 1910	Western Africa	Size: 12–20 cm (5–8 in) long, plus 13–18 cm (5–7 in) tail Habitat: Savanna and forest Diet: Roots, bulbs, seeds, vegetation, and insects	LC Unknown
Savanna gerbil	G. validus (Bocage, 1890)	Central Africa	Size: 13–20 cm (5–8 in) long, plus 11–19 cm (4–7 in) tail Habitat: Savanna Diet: Roots, bulbs, seeds, vegetation, and insects	LC Unknown

Genus Gerbillus – Desmarest, 1804 – 49 species
Common name	Scientific name and subspecies	Range	Size and ecology	IUCN status and estimated population
Agag gerbil	G. agag Thomas, 1903	Central Africa	Size: 9–14 cm (4–6 in) long, plus 10–15 cm (4–6 in) tail Habitat: Unknown Diet: Seeds, roots, nuts, grass, and insects	DD Unknown
Algerian gerbil	G. garamantis (Lataste, 1881)	Northern Africa	Size: 7–8 cm (3–3 in) long, plus about 11 cm (4 in) tail Habitat: Desert, shrubland, and savanna Diet: Seeds, roots, nuts, grass, and insects	NE Unknown
Anderson's gerbil	G. andersoni De Winton, 1902	Northeastern Africa and western Middle East	Size: 7–12 cm (3–5 in) long, plus 9–14 cm (4–6 in) tail Habitat: Desert and coastal marine Diet: Seeds, roots, nuts, grass, and insects	LC Unknown
Balochistan gerbil	G. nanus Blanford, 1875	Northern Africa and western Asia	Size: 7–11 cm (3–4 in) long, plus 8–15 cm (3–6 in) tail Habitat: Desert, shrubland, and savanna Diet: Seeds, roots, nuts, grass, and insects	LC Unknown
Berbera gerbil	G. acticola Thomas, 1918	Somalia	Size: 9–11 cm (4–4 in) long, plus 12–15 cm (5–6 in) tail Habitat: Unknown Diet: Seeds, roots, nuts, grass, and insects	DD Unknown
Black-tufted gerbil	G. famulus Yerbury & Thomas, 1895	Yemen	Size: 8–11 cm (3–4 in) long, plus 12–15 cm (5–6 in) tail Habitat: Desert, shrubland, and savanna Diet: Seeds, roots, nuts, grass, and insects	LC Unknown
Botta's gerbil	G. bottai (Lataste, 1882)	Sudan	Size: 8–10 cm (3–4 in) long, plus 10–11 cm (4–4 in) tail Habitat: Unknown Diet: Seeds, roots, nuts, grass, and insects	DD Unknown
Brockman's gerbil	G. brockmani (Thomas, 1910)	Somalia	Size: 7–9 cm (3–4 in) long, plus 10–12 cm (4–5 in) tail Habitat: Unknown Diet: Seeds, roots, nuts, grass, and insects	DD Unknown
Burton's gerbil	G. burtoni (F. Cuvier, 1838)	Sudan	Size: Unknown Habitat: Unknown Diet: Seeds, roots, nuts, grass, and insects	DD Unknown
Cheesman's gerbil	G. cheesmani Thomas, 1919	Middle East	Size: 7–11 cm (3–4 in) long, plus 9–15 cm (4–6 in) tail Habitat: Shrubland and desert Diet: Seeds, roots, nuts, grass, and insects	LC Unknown
Cushioned gerbil	G. pulvinatus Rhoads, 1896	Eastern Africa	Size: 8–11 cm (3–4 in) long, plus 11–15 cm (4–6 in) tail Habitat: Rocky areas, savanna, desert, grassland, and shrubland Diet: Seeds, roots, nuts, grass, and insects	LC Unknown
Darfur gerbil	G. muriculus Thomas & Hinton, 1923	Sudan	Size: About 7 cm (3 in) long, plus about 8 cm (3 in) tail Habitat: Unknown Diet: Seeds, roots, nuts, grass, and insects	DD Unknown
Dunn's gerbil	G. dunni Thomas, 1904	Eastern Africa	Size: 9–11 cm (4–4 in) long, plus 13–15 cm (5–6 in) tail Habitat: Desert, rocky areas, grassland, and savanna Diet: Seeds, roots, nuts, grass, and insects	LC Unknown
Flower's gerbil	G. floweri (Thomas, 1919)	Egypt	Size: 9–13 cm (4–5 in) long, plus 13–16 cm (5–6 in) tail Habitat: Desert, shrubland, and rocky areas Diet: Seeds, roots, nuts, grass, and insects	LC Unknown
Greater Egyptian gerbil	G. pyramidum Geoffroy, 1803	Northern Africa	Size: 10–14 cm (4–6 in) long, plus 12–18 cm (5–7 in) tail Habitat: Desert Diet: Seeds, roots, nuts, grass, and insects	LC Unknown
Greater short-tailed gerbil	G. maghrebi (Schlitter & Setzer, 1972)	Morocco	Size: 10–12 cm (4–5 in) long, plus 10–12 cm (4–5 in) tail Habitat: Shrubland and grassland Diet: Seeds, roots, nuts, grass, and insects	LC Unknown
Grobben's gerbil	G. grobbeni Klaptocz, 1909	Northern Libya	Size: About 8 cm (3 in) long, plus about 12 cm (5 in) tail Habitat: Coastal marine Diet: Seeds, roots, nuts, grass, and insects	DD Unknown
Harrison's gerbil	G. mesopotamiae Harrison, 1956	Middle East	Size: 7–10 cm (3–4 in) long, plus 8–13 cm (3–5 in) tail Habitat: Desert Diet: Seeds, roots, nuts, grass, and insects	LC Unknown
Harwood's gerbil	G. harwoodi (Thomas, 1901)	Kenya and Tanzania	Size: 6–9 cm (2–4 in) long, plus 8–12 cm (3–5 in) tail Habitat: Savanna, grassland, and forest Diet: Seeds, roots, nuts, grass, and insects	LC Unknown
Hoogstraal's gerbil	G. hoogstraali (Lay, 1975)	Morocco	Size: 8–10 cm (3–4 in) long, plus 10–13 cm (4–5 in) tail Habitat: Desert and coastal marine Diet: Seeds, roots, nuts, grass, and insects	VU Unknown
Indian hairy-footed gerbil	G. gleadowi (Murray, 1886)	Pakistan and India	Size: 7–11 cm (3–4 in) long, plus 11–15 cm (4–6 in) tail Habitat: Desert Diet: Seeds, roots, nuts, grass, and insects	LC Unknown
James's gerbil	G. jamesi (Harrison, 1867)	Tunisia	Size: About 8 cm (3 in) long, plus about 11 cm (4 in) tail Habitat: Unknown Diet: Seeds, roots, nuts, grass, and insects	DD Unknown
Khartoum gerbil	G. stigmonyx (Heuglin, 1877)	Sudan	Size: 8–10 cm (3–4 in) long, plus 9–11 cm (4–4 in) tail Habitat: Shrubland, rocky areas, and grassland Diet: Seeds, roots, nuts, grass, and insects	DD Unknown
Large Aden gerbil	G. poecilops Yerbury & Thomas, 1895	Western Saudi Arabia and western Yemen	Size: 15–22 cm (6–9 in) long, plus 7–11 cm (3–4 in) tail Habitat: Shrubland and desert Diet: Seeds, roots, nuts, grass, and insects	LC Unknown
Lataste's gerbil	G. latastei Thomas, 1903	Tunisia	Size: 9–12 cm (4–5 in) long, plus 11–15 cm (4–6 in) tail Habitat: Shrubland and desert Diet: Seeds, roots, nuts, grass, and insects	DD Unknown
Least gerbil	G. pusillus Peters, 1878	Eastern Africa	Size: 5–8 cm (2–3 in) long, plus 8–12 cm (3–5 in) tail Habitat: Grassland, rocky areas, and shrubland Diet: Seeds, roots, nuts, grass, and insects	LC Unknown
Lesser Egyptian gerbil	G. gerbillus (Olivier, 1801)	Northern Africa	Size: 7–11 cm (3–4 in) long, plus 9–14 cm (4–6 in) tail Habitat: Coastal marine and desert Diet: Seeds, roots, nuts, grass, and insects	LC Unknown
Lesser short-tailed gerbil	G. simoni Lataste, 1881	Northern Africa	Size: 6–11 cm (2–4 in) long, plus 5–10 cm (2–4 in) tail Habitat: Shrubland Diet: Seeds, roots, nuts, grass, and insects	LC Unknown
Lowe's gerbil	G. lowei (Thomas & Hinton, 1923)	Western Sudan	Size: 8–12 cm (3–5 in) long, plus 14–16 cm (6–6 in) tail Habitat: Rocky areas Diet: Seeds, roots, nuts, grass, and insects	DD Unknown
Mackilligin's gerbil	G. mackilligini (Thomas, 1904)	Southern Egypt and Northern Sudan	Size: 7–9 cm (3–4 in) long, plus 9–14 cm (4–6 in) tail Habitat: Desert and shrubland Diet: Seeds, roots, nuts, grass, and insects	LC Unknown
Mauritanian gerbil	G. mauritaniae Heim de Balsac, 1943	Northern Mauritania	Size: About 6 cm (2 in) long, plus about 8 cm (3 in) tail Habitat: Savanna and grassland Diet: Seeds, roots, nuts, grass, and insects	NE Unknown
Nigerian gerbil	G. nigeriae Thomas & Hinton, 1920	Western Mauritania	Size: 7–11 cm (3–4 in) long, plus 10–16 cm (4–6 in) tail Habitat: Savanna, grassland, desert, and shrubland Diet: Seeds, roots, nuts, grass, and insects	LC Unknown
North African gerbil	G. campestris Loche, 1867	Northern Africa	Size: 9–12 cm (4–5 in) long, plus 11–16 cm (4–6 in) tail Habitat: Rocky areas and desert Diet: Seeds, roots, nuts, grass, and insects	LC Unknown
Occidental gerbil	G. occiduus Lay, 1975	Morocco	Size: 7–10 cm (3–4 in) long, plus 9–13 cm (4–5 in) tail Habitat: Coastal marine and desert Diet: Seeds, roots, nuts, grass, and insects	DD Unknown
Pale gerbil	G. perpallidus Setzer, 1958	Northern Egypt	Size: 9–13 cm (4–5 in) long, plus 13–16 cm (5–6 in) tail Habitat: Coastal marine and desert Diet: Seeds, roots, nuts, grass, and insects	LC Unknown
Pleasant gerbil	G. amoenus (De Winton, 1902)	Scattered northern Africa	Size: 7–11 cm (3–4 in) long, plus 9–15 cm (4–6 in) tail Habitat: Savanna, desert, and coastal marine Diet: Seeds, roots, nuts, grass, and insects	LC Unknown
Principal gerbil	G. principulus Thomas & Hinton, 1923	Western Sudan	Size: About 7 cm (3 in) long, plus about 12 cm (5 in) tail Habitat: Grassland and shrubland Diet: Seeds, roots, nuts, grass, and insects	DD Unknown
Pygmy gerbil	G. henleyi De Winton, 1903	Northern Africa and Middle East	Size: 5–8 cm (2–3 in) long, plus 7–11 cm (3–4 in) tail Habitat: Desert, shrubland, and rocky areas Diet: Seeds, roots, nuts, grass, and insects	LC Unknown
Rosalinda gerbil	G. rosalinda St. Leger, 1929	Sudan	Size: 8–11 cm (3–4 in) long, plus 10–13 cm (4–5 in) tail Habitat: Grassland Diet: Seeds, roots, nuts, grass, and insects	LC Unknown
Rupicolous gerbil	G. rupicola (Granjon, Aniskin, Volobouev, & Sicard, 2002)	Mali	Size: 9–11 cm (4–4 in) long, plus 13–15 cm (5–6 in) tail Habitat: Savanna and rocky areas Diet: Seeds, roots, nuts, grass, and insects	LC Unknown
Sand gerbil	G. syrticus (Misonne, 1974)	Northeastern Libya	Size: About 5 cm (2 in) long, plus about 5 cm (2 in) tail Habitat: Desert, shrubland, and rocky areas Diet: Seeds, roots, nuts, grass, and insects	NE Unknown
Somalian gerbil	G. somalicus (Thomas, 1910)	Eastern Africa	Size: 8–9 cm (3–4 in) long, plus 11–13 cm (4–5 in) tail Habitat: Grassland, desert, and shrubland Diet: Seeds, roots, nuts, grass, and insects	DD Unknown
Sudan gerbil	G. nancillus Thomas & Hinton, 1923	Northern Africa	Size: 5–7 cm (2–3 in) long, plus 7–9 cm (3–4 in) tail Habitat: Savanna and grassland Diet: Seeds, roots, nuts, grass, and insects	DD Unknown
Swarthy gerbil	G. aquilus Schlitter & Setzer, 1972	West-central Asia	Size: 9–11 cm (4–4 in) long, plus 12–16 cm (5–6 in) tail Habitat: Grassland and forest Diet: Seeds, roots, nuts, grass, and insects	LC Unknown
Tarabul's gerbil	G. tarabuli (Thomas, 1902)	Northwestern Africa	Size: 8–12 cm (3–5 in) long, plus 10–16 cm (4–6 in) tail Habitat: Desert, coastal marine, and savanna Diet: Seeds, roots, nuts, grass, and insects	LC Unknown
Vivacious gerbil	G. vivax (Thomas, 1902)	Northern Africa and western Asia	Size: About 8 cm (3 in) long, plus about 11 cm (4 in) tail Habitat: Desert, shrubland, savanna, and coastal marine Diet: Seeds, roots, nuts, grass, and insects	NE Unknown
Wagner's gerbil	G. dasyurus (Wagner, 1842)	Egypt and Middle East	Size: 7–11 cm (3–4 in) long, plus 8–14 cm (3–6 in) tail Habitat: Rocky areas, desert, and shrubland Diet: Seeds, roots, nuts, grass, and insects	LC Unknown
Waters's gerbil	G. watersi De Winton, 1901	Sudan and Egypt	Size: 7–10 cm (3–4 in) long, plus 9–13 cm (4–5 in) tail Habitat: Shrubland, desert, and grassland Diet: Seeds, roots, nuts, grass, and insects	LC Unknown
Western gerbil	G. hesperinus Cabrera, 1936	Morocco	Size: 9–12 cm (4–5 in) long, plus 9–12 cm (4–5 in) tail Habitat: Coastal marine Diet: Seeds, roots, nuts, grass, and insects	EN Unknown

Genus Meriones – Illiger, 1811 – seventeen species
Common name	Scientific name and subspecies	Range	Size and ecology	IUCN status and estimated population
Arabian jird	M. arimalius Cheesman & Hinton, 1924	Arabian Peninsula	Size: About 13 cm (5 in) long, plus about 16 cm (6 in) tail Habitat: Desert Diet: Vegetation, roots, bulbs, seeds, grain, fruit, and insects	LC Unknown
Buxton's jird	M. sacramenti Thomas, 1922	Egypt and Middle East	Size: 13–17 cm (5–7 in) long, plus 12–18 cm (5–7 in) tail Habitat: Desert, grassland, and shrubland Diet: Vegetation, roots, bulbs, seeds, grain, fruit, and insects	VU Unknown
Cheng's jird	M. chengi Wang, 1964	Northwestern China	Size: 11–15 cm (4–6 in) long, plus 8–12 cm (3–5 in) tail Habitat: Shrubland and grassland Diet: Vegetation, roots, bulbs, seeds, grain, fruit, and insects	LC Unknown
Dahl's jird	M. dahli Shidlovski, 1962	Western Asia	Size: 10–14 cm (4–6 in) long, plus 7–14 cm (3–6 in) tail Habitat: Desert Diet: Vegetation, roots, bulbs, seeds, grain, fruit, and insects	CR 1600–2000
Indian desert jird	M. hurrianae Jerdon, 1867	Southern Asia	Size: 11–15 cm (4–6 in) long, plus 10–16 cm (4–6 in) tail Habitat: Savanna, shrubland, desert, and grassland Diet: Vegetation, roots, bulbs, seeds, grain, fruit, and insects	LC Unknown
King jird	M. rex Yerbury & Thomas, 1895	Saudi Arabia and Yemen	Size: 13–18 cm (5–7 in) long, plus 10–20 cm (4–8 in) tail Habitat: Desert, shrubland, and savanna Diet: Vegetation, roots, bulbs, seeds, grain, fruit, and insects	LC Unknown
Libyan jird	M. libycus Lichtenstein, 1823	Northern Africa and western and central Asia	Size: 12–17 cm (5–7 in) long, plus 11–19 cm (4–7 in) tail Habitat: Inland wetlands, shrubland, and desert Diet: Vegetation, roots, bulbs, seeds, grain, fruit, and insects	LC Unknown
Midday jird	M. meridianus (Pallas, 1773)	Southwestern Russia	Size: 10–14 cm (4–6 in) long, plus 7–14 cm (3–6 in) tail Habitat: Desert Diet: Vegetation, roots, bulbs, seeds, grain, fruit, and insects	LC Unknown
Mongolian gerbil	M. unguiculatus (A. Milne-Edwards, 1867)	East-central Asia	Size: 9–14 cm (4–6 in) long, plus 8–11 cm (3–4 in) tail Habitat: Grassland, shrubland, and desert Diet: Vegetation, roots, bulbs, seeds, grain, fruit, and insects	LC Unknown
Moroccan jird	M. grandis Cabrera, 1907	Northwestern Africa	Size: 15–20 cm (6–8 in) long, plus 16–18 cm (6–7 in) tail Habitat: Shrubland Diet: Vegetation, roots, bulbs, seeds, grain, fruit, and insects	LC Unknown
Persian jird	M. persicus (Blanford, 1875)	West-central Asia	Size: 12–17 cm (5–7 in) long, plus 12–19 cm (5–7 in) tail Habitat: Shrubland, rocky areas, and grassland Diet: Vegetation, roots, bulbs, seeds, grain, fruit, and insects	LC Unknown
Shaw's jird	M. shawi (Duvernoy, 1842)	Northern Africa	Size: 13–18 cm (5–7 in) long, plus 11–18 cm (4–7 in) tail Habitat: Shrubland Diet: Vegetation, roots, bulbs, seeds, grain, fruit, and insects	LC Unknown
Sundevall's jird	M. crassus Sundevall, 1842	Northern Africa and western Asia	Size: 10–16 cm (4–6 in) long, plus 9–16 cm (4–6 in) tail Habitat: Desert Diet: Vegetation, roots, bulbs, seeds, grain, fruit, and insects	LC Unknown
Tamarisk jird	M. tamariscinus (Pallas, 1773)	Southwestern Russia	Size: 13–19 cm (5–7 in) long, plus 11–15 cm (4–6 in) tail Habitat: Desert and grassland Diet: Vegetation, roots, bulbs, seeds, grain, fruit, and insects	LC Unknown
Tristram's jird	M. tristrami Thomas, 1892	Western Asia	Size: 10–18 cm (4–7 in) long, plus 10–17 cm (4–7 in) tail Habitat: Shrubland Diet: Vegetation, roots, bulbs, seeds, grain, fruit, and insects	LC Unknown
Vinogradov's jird	M. vinogradovi Geptner, 1931	Western Asia	Size: 14–17 cm (6–7 in) long, plus 13–17 cm (5–7 in) tail Habitat: Shrubland and rocky areas Diet: Vegetation, roots, bulbs, seeds, grain, fruit, and insects	LC Unknown
Zarudny's jird	M. zarudnyi Geptner, 1937	Central Asia	Size: About 16 cm (6 in) long, plus about 16 cm (6 in) tail Habitat: Desert Diet: Vegetation, roots, bulbs, seeds, grain, fruit, and insects	DD Unknown

Genus Microdillus – Thomas, 1910 – one species
Common name	Scientific name and subspecies	Range	Size and ecology	IUCN status and estimated population
Somali pygmy gerbil	M. peeli (De Winton, 1898)	Somalia	Size: 6–8 cm (2–3 in) long, plus 5–7 cm (2–3 in) tail Habitat: Grassland and shrubland Diet: Seeds, roots, nuts, grass, and insects	DD Unknown

Genus Pachyuromys – Lataste, 1880 – one species
Common name	Scientific name and subspecies	Range	Size and ecology	IUCN status and estimated population
Fat-tailed gerbil	P. duprasi Lataste, 1880	Northern Africa	Size: 9–12 cm (4–5 in) long, plus 5–7 cm (2–3 in) tail Habitat: Shrubland and desert Diet: Insects	LC Unknown

Genus Psammomys – Cretzschmar, 1828 – two species
Common name	Scientific name and subspecies	Range	Size and ecology	IUCN status and estimated population
Fat sand rat	P. obesus Cretzschmar, 1828	Northern Africa and Middle East	Size: 11–19 cm (4–7 in) long, plus 8–14 cm (3–6 in) tail Habitat: Shrubland, inland wetlands, desert, and other Diet: Succulents and other plants	LC Unknown
Thin sand rat	P. vexillaris Thomas, 1925	Northern Africa	Size: 11–13 cm (4–5 in) long, plus 8–12 cm (3–5 in) tail Habitat: Inland wetlands, shrubland, and other Diet: Succulents and other plants	DD Unknown

Genus Rhombomys – Wagner, 1841 – one species
Common name	Scientific name and subspecies	Range	Size and ecology	IUCN status and estimated population
Great gerbil	R. opimus (Lichtenstein, 1823)	Central Asia	Size: 15–19 cm (6–7 in) long, plus 13–16 cm (5–6 in) tail Habitat: Desert, grassland, and shrubland Diet: Variety of desert plants	LC Unknown

Genus Sekeetamys – Ellerman, 1947 – one species
Common name	Scientific name and subspecies	Range	Size and ecology	IUCN status and estimated population
Bushy-tailed jird	S. calurus (Thomas, 1892)	Egypt and Middle East	Size: 9–13 cm (4–5 in) long, plus 11–17 cm (4–7 in) tail Habitat: Rocky areas and desert Diet: Plants and insects	LC Unknown

Genus Tatera – Lataste, 1882 – one species
Common name	Scientific name and subspecies	Range	Size and ecology	IUCN status and estimated population
Indian gerbil	T. indica (Hardwicke, 1807)	Southern and western Asia	Size: 14–21 cm (6–8 in) long, plus 15–20 cm (6–8 in) tail Habitat: Forest, desert, grassland, and shrubland Diet: Roots, bulbs, seeds, vegetation, insects, eggs, and birds	LC Unknown

Genus Taterillus – Thomas, 1910 – nine species
Common name	Scientific name and subspecies	Range	Size and ecology	IUCN status and estimated population
Congo gerbil	T. congicus Thomas, 1915	Central Africa	Size: 9–15 cm (4–6 in) long, plus 13–19 cm (5–7 in) tail Habitat: Savanna and shrubland Diet: Grain and insects	LC Unknown
Emin's gerbil	T. emini (Thomas, 1892)	Eastern Africa	Size: 10–11 cm (4–4 in) long, plus 15–16 cm (6–6 in) tail Habitat: Grassland, savanna, and shrubland Diet: Grain and insects	LC Unknown
Gracile tateril	T. gracilis (Thomas, 1892)	Western Africa	Size: 9–13 cm (4–5 in) long, plus 13–18 cm (5–7 in) tail Habitat: Savanna, forest, and shrubland Diet: Grain and insects	LC Unknown
Harrington's gerbil	T. harringtoni (Thomas, 1906)	Eastern Africa	Size: 10–11 cm (4–4 in) long, plus 15–16 cm (6–6 in) tail Habitat: Shrubland and savanna Diet: Grain and insects	NE Unknown
Lake Chad gerbil	T. lacustris (Thomas & Wroughton, 1907)	North-central Africa	Size: 10–14 cm (4–6 in) long, plus 13–17 cm (5–7 in) tail Habitat: Shrubland and savanna Diet: Grain and insects	LC Unknown
Petter's gerbil	T. petteri Sicard, Tranier, & Gautun, 1988	Western Africa	Size: 10–14 cm (4–6 in) long, plus 12–17 cm (5–7 in) tail Habitat: Savanna and shrubland Diet: Grain and insects	LC Unknown
Robbins's tateril	T. arenarius Robbins, 1974	Western Africa	Size: 11–15 cm (4–6 in) long, plus 14–16 cm (6–6 in) tail Habitat: Shrubland and savanna Diet: Grain and insects	LC Unknown
Senegal gerbil	T. pygargus (F. Cuvier, 1838)	Western Africa	Size: 10–14 cm (4–6 in) long, plus 12–17 cm (5–7 in) tail Habitat: Shrubland and savanna Diet: Grain and insects	LC Unknown
Tranier's tateril	T. tranieri Dobigny, Granjon, Aniskin, Ba, & Volobouev, 2003	Southern Mauritania and western Mali	Size: 11–14 cm (4–6 in) long, plus 15–18 cm (6–7 in) tail Habitat: Savanna and shrubland Diet: Grain and insects	LC Unknown

== Sources ==
- Chernasky, Amy; Motis, Anna; Burgin, Connor, eds. (2023). All the Mammals of the World. Lynx Nature Books. ISBN 978-84-16728-66-4.
- Nowak, Ronald M. (1999). Walker's Mammals of the World. Vol. 2 (6th ed.). Johns Hopkins University Press. ISBN 978-0-8018-5789-8.
- Musser, Guy G.; Carleton, Michael D. (2005). Wilson, Don E.; Reeder, DeeAnn M. (eds.). Mammal Species of the World. Vol. 2 (3rd ed.). Johns Hopkins University Press. ISBN 978-0-8018-8221-0.
