= List of mammals of Sudan =

This is a list of the mammal species recorded in Sudan. There are 188 mammal species in Sudan, of which three are critically endangered, five are endangered, eleven are vulnerable, and nine are near threatened. One of the species listed for Sudan can possibly no longer be found in the wild.

The following tags are used to highlight each species' conservation status as assessed by the International Union for Conservation of Nature:

EX	Extinct	No reasonable doubt that the last individual has died.
EW	Extinct in the wild	Known only to survive in captivity or as a naturalized populations well outside its previous range.
CR	Critically endangered	The species is in imminent risk of extinction in the wild.
EN	Endangered	The species is facing an extremely high risk of extinction in the wild.
VU	Vulnerable	The species is facing a high risk of extinction in the wild.
NT	Near threatened	The species does not meet any of the criteria that would categorise it as risking extinction but it is likely to do so in the future.
LC	Least concern	There are no current identifiable risks to the species.
DD	Data deficient	There is inadequate information to make an assessment of the risks to this species.

Some species were assessed using an earlier set of criteria. Species assessed using this system have the following instead of near threatened and least concern categories:

LR/cd	Lower risk/conservation dependent	Species which were the focus of conservation programmes and may have moved into a higher risk category if that programme was discontinued.
LR/nt	Lower risk/near threatened	Species which are close to being classified as vulnerable but are not the subject of conservation programmes.
LR/lc	Lower risk/least concern	Species for which there are no identifiable risks.

== Order: Tubulidentata (aardvarks) ==
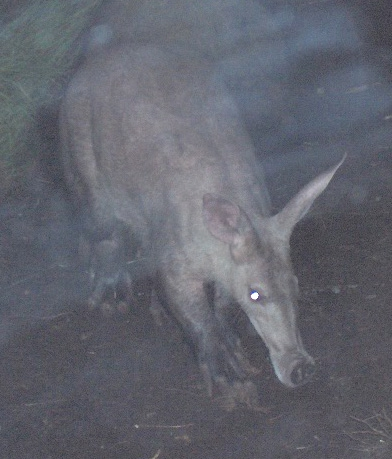
Aardvark

The order Tubulidentata consists of a single species, the aardvark. Tubulidentata are characterised by their teeth which lack a pulp cavity and form thin tubes which are continuously worn down and replaced.

- Family: Orycteropodidae
  - Genus: Orycteropus
    - Aardvark, O. afer LC

== Order: Hyracoidea (hyraxes) ==
The hyraxes are any of four species of fairly small, thickset, herbivorous mammals in the order Hyracoidea. About the size of a domestic cat they are well-furred, with rounded bodies and a stumpy tail. They are native to Africa and the Middle East.

- Family: Procaviidae (hyraxes)
  - Genus: Heterohyrax
    - Yellow-spotted rock hyrax, Heterohyrax brucei LC
  - Genus: Procavia
    - Rock hyrax, Procavia capensis LC

== Order: Sirenia (manatees and dugongs) ==
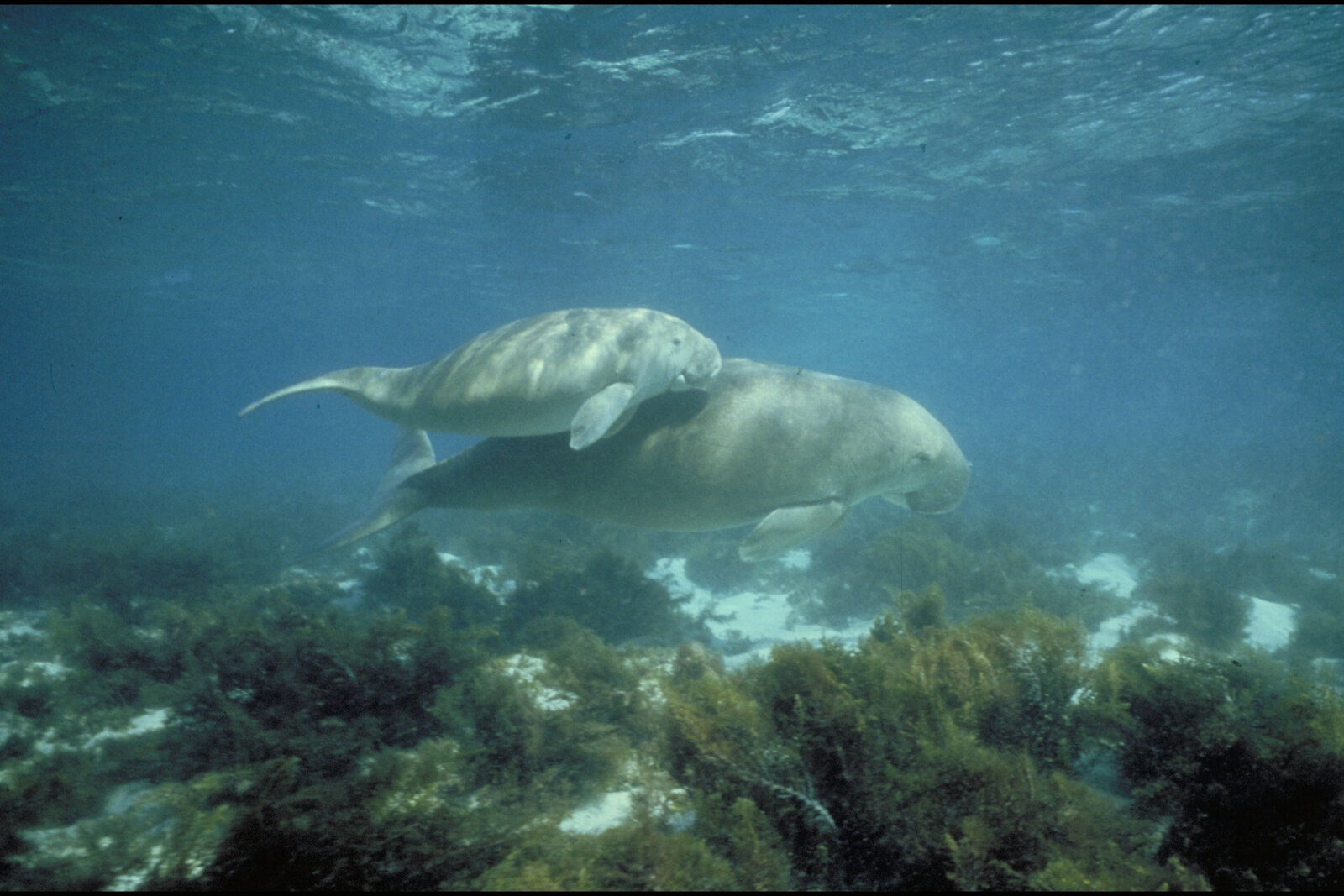
Dugongs

Sirenia is an order of fully aquatic, herbivorous mammals that inhabit rivers, estuaries, coastal marine waters, swamps, and marine wetlands. All four species are endangered.

- Family: Dugongidae
  - Genus: Dugong
    - Dugong, Dugong dugon VU

== Order: Primates ==
The order Primates contains humans and their closest relatives: lemurs, lorisoids, tarsiers, monkeys, and apes.

- Suborder: Strepsirrhini
  - Infraorder: Lemuriformes
    - Superfamily: Lorisoidea
      - Family: Galagidae
        - Genus: Galago
          - Senegal bushbaby, Galago senegalensis LR/lc
- Suborder: Haplorhini
  - Infraorder: Simiiformes
    - Parvorder: Catarrhini
      - Superfamily: Cercopithecoidea
        - Family: Cercopithecidae (Old World monkeys)
          - Genus: Erythrocebus
            - Patas monkey, Erythrocebus patas LR/lc
          - Genus: Chlorocebus
            - Grivet, Chlorocebus aethiops LR/lc
            - Tantalus monkey, Chlorocebus tantalus LR/lc
          - Genus: Papio
            - Olive baboon, Papio anubis LR/lc
            - Hamadryas baboon, Papio hamadryas LR/lc

== Order: Rodentia (rodents) ==
Rodents make up the largest order of mammals, with over 40% of mammalian species. They have two incisors in the upper and lower jaw which grow continually and must be kept short by gnawing. Most rodents are small though the capybara can weigh up to 45 kg (99 lb).

- Suborder: Hystricognathi
  - Family: Bathyergidae
    - Genus: Cryptomys
      - Ochre mole-rat, Cryptomys ochraceocinereus DD
  - Family: Hystricidae (Old World porcupines)
    - Genus: Hystrix
      - Crested porcupine, Hystrix cristata LC
- Suborder: Sciurognathi
  - Family: Sciuridae (squirrels)
    - Subfamily: Xerinae
      - Tribe: Xerini
        - Genus: Xerus
          - Striped ground squirrel, Xerus erythropus LC
          - Unstriped ground squirrel, Xerus rutilus LC
      - Tribe: Protoxerini
        - Genus: Heliosciurus
          - Gambian sun squirrel, Heliosciurus gambianus LC
  - Family: Gliridae (dormice)
    - Subfamily: Graphiurinae
      - Genus: Graphiurus
        - Small-eared dormouse, Graphiurus microtis LC
  - Family: Dipodidae (jerboas)
    - Subfamily: Dipodinae
      - Genus: Jaculus
        - Lesser Egyptian jerboa, Jaculus jaculus LC
  - Family: Nesomyidae
    - Subfamily: Cricetomyinae
      - Genus: Cricetomys
        - Gambian pouched rat, Cricetomys gambianus LC
  - Family: Cricetidae
    - Subfamily: Lophiomyinae
      - Genus: Lophiomys
        - Maned rat, Lophiomys imhausi LC
  - Family: Muridae (mice, rats, voles, gerbils, hamsters, etc.)
    - Subfamily: Deomyinae
      - Genus: Acomys
        - Cairo spiny mouse, Acomys cahirinus LC
        - Gray spiny mouse, Acomys cineraceus LC
    - Subfamily: Gerbillinae
      - Genus: Desmodilliscus
        - Pouched gerbil, Desmodilliscus braueri LC
      - Genus: Dipodillus
        - North African gerbil, Dipodillus campestris LC
        - Mackilligin's gerbil, Dipodillus mackilligini LC
      - Genus: Gerbillus
        - Agag gerbil, Gerbillus agag DD
        - Botta's gerbil, Gerbillus bottai DD
        - Burton's gerbil, Gerbillus burtoni DD
        - Dongola gerbil, Gerbillus dongolanus DD
        - Lesser Egyptian gerbil, Gerbillus gerbillus LC
        - Pygmy gerbil, Gerbillus henleyi LC
        - Lowe's gerbil, Gerbillus lowei DD
        - Darfur gerbil, Gerbillus muriculus LC
        - Sudan gerbil, Gerbillus nancillus DD
        - Principal gerbil, Gerbillus principulus DD
        - Greater Egyptian gerbil, Gerbillus pyramidum LC
        - Rosalinda gerbil, Gerbillus rosalinda DD
        - Khartoum gerbil, Gerbillus stigmonyx DD
        - Waters's gerbil, Gerbillus watersi LC
      - Genus: Meriones
        - Sundevall's jird, Meriones crassus LC
      - Genus: Sekeetamys
        - Bushy-tailed jird, Sekeetamys calurus LC
      - Genus: Tatera
        - Kemp's gerbil, Tatera kempi LC
        - Fringe-tailed gerbil, Tatera robusta LC
        - Savanna gerbil, Tatera valida LC
      - Genus: Taterillus
        - Congo gerbil, Taterillus congicus LC
        - Emin's gerbil, Taterillus emini LC
    - Subfamily: Murinae
      - Genus: Aethomys
        - Hinde's rock rat, Aethomys hindei LC
      - Genus: Arvicanthis
        - African grass rat, Arvicanthis niloticus LC
      - Genus: Grammomys
        - Arid thicket rat, Grammomys aridulus NT
      - Genus: Lemniscomys
        - Heuglin's striped grass mouse, Lemniscomys zebra LC
      - Genus: Mastomys
        - Guinea multimammate mouse, Mastomys erythroleucus LC
        - Verheyen's multimammate mouse, Mastomys kollmannspergeri LC
        - Natal multimammate mouse, Mastomys natalensis LC
      - Genus: Myomyscus
        - Brockman's rock mouse, Myomyscus brockmani LC
      - Genus: Praomys
        - Dalton's mouse, Praomys daltoni LC
        - Jackson's soft-furred mouse, Praomys jacksoni LC
      - Genus: Zelotomys
        - Hildegarde's broad-headed mouse, Zelotomys hildegardeae LC

== Order: Lagomorpha (lagomorphs) ==
The lagomorphs comprise two families, Leporidae (hares and rabbits), and Ochotonidae (pikas). Though they can resemble rodents, and were classified as a superfamily in that order until the early 20th century, they have since been considered a separate order. They differ from rodents in a number of physical characteristics, such as having four incisors in the upper jaw rather than two.

- Family: Leporidae (rabbits, hares)
  - Genus: Lepus
    - Cape hare, Lepus capensis LR/lc
    - African savanna hare, Lepus microtis LR/lc

== Order: Erinaceomorpha (hedgehogs and gymnures) ==
The order Erinaceomorpha contains a single family, Erinaceidae, which comprise the hedgehogs and gymnures. The hedgehogs are easily recognised by their spines while gymnures look more like large rats.

- Family: Erinaceidae (hedgehogs)
  - Subfamily: Erinaceinae
    - Genus: Atelerix
      - Four-toed hedgehog, Atelerix albiventris LR/lc
    - Genus: Hemiechinus
      - Desert hedgehog, Hemiechinus aethiopicus LR/lc

== Order: Soricomorpha (shrews, moles, and solenodons) ==
The "shrew-forms" are insectivorous mammals. The shrews and solenodons closely resemble mice while the moles are stout-bodied burrowers.

- Family: Soricidae (shrews)
  - Subfamily: Crocidurinae
    - Genus: Crocidura
      - Savanna shrew, Crocidura fulvastra LC
      - Bicolored musk shrew, Crocidura fuscomurina LC
      - African giant shrew, Crocidura olivieri LC
      - Small-footed shrew, Crocidura parvipes LC
      - Sahelian tiny shrew, Crocidura pasha LC
      - Somali shrew, Crocidura somalica LC
      - Savanna path shrew, Crocidura viaria LC
      - Voi shrew, Crocidura voi LC
      - Yankari shrew, Crocidura yankariensis LC

== Order: Chiroptera (bats) ==
The bats' most distinguishing feature is that their forelimbs are developed as wings, making them the only mammals capable of flight. Bat species account for about 20% of all mammals.

- Family: Pteropodidae (flying foxes, Old World fruit bats)
  - Subfamily: Pteropodinae
    - Genus: Eidolon
      - Straw-coloured fruit bat, Eidolon helvum LC
    - Genus: Epomophorus
      - Gambian epauletted fruit bat, Epomophorus gambianus LC
      - Ethiopian epauletted fruit bat, Epomophorus labiatus LC
    - Genus: Lissonycteris
      - Angolan rousette, Lissonycteris angolensis LC
    - Genus: Micropteropus
      - Peters's dwarf epauletted fruit bat, Micropteropus pusillus LC
    - Genus: Rousettus
      - Egyptian fruit bat, Rousettus aegyptiacus LC
- Family: Vespertilionidae
  - Subfamily: Vespertilioninae
    - Genus: Eptesicus
      - Horn-skinned bat, Eptesicus floweri VU
    - Genus: Glauconycteris
      - Butterfly bat, Glauconycteris variegata LC
    - Genus: Hypsugo
      - Desert pipistrelle, Hypsugo ariel DD
    - Genus: Neoromicia
      - Cape serotine, Neoromicia capensis LC
      - Tiny serotine, Neoromicia guineensis LC
      - Banana pipistrelle, Neoromicia nanus LC
      - Rendall's serotine, Neoromicia rendalli LC
      - Somali serotine, Neoromicia somalicus LC
    - Genus: Nycticeinops
      - Schlieffen's bat, Nycticeinops schlieffeni LC
    - Genus: Pipistrellus
      - Egyptian pipistrelle, Pipistrellus deserti LC
      - Rüppell's pipistrelle, Pipistrellus rueppelli LC
      - Rusty pipistrelle, Pipistrellus rusticus LC
    - Genus: Scotoecus
      - Dark-winged lesser house bat, Scotoecus hirundo DD
    - Genus: Scotophilus
      - African yellow bat, Scotophilus dinganii LC
      - White-bellied yellow bat, Scotophilus leucogaster LC
      - Greenish yellow bat, Scotophilus viridis LC
- Family: Rhinopomatidae
  - Genus: Rhinopoma
    - Egyptian mouse-tailed bat, R. cystops LC
    - Lesser mouse-tailed bat, Rhinopoma hardwickei LC
    - Greater mouse-tailed bat, Rhinopoma microphyllum LC
- Family: Molossidae
  - Genus: Chaerephon
    - Ansorge's free-tailed bat, Chaerephon ansorgei LC
    - Lappet-eared free-tailed bat, Chaerephon major LC
    - Little free-tailed bat, Chaerephon pumila LC
  - Genus: Mops
    - Angolan free-tailed bat, Mops condylurus LC
    - Mongalla free-tailed bat, Mops demonstrator NT
    - Midas free-tailed bat, Mops midas LC
- Family: Emballonuridae
  - Genus: Coleura
    - African sheath-tailed bat, Coleura afra LC
  - Genus: Taphozous
    - Mauritian tomb bat, Taphozous mauritianus LC
    - Naked-rumped tomb bat, Taphozous nudiventris LC
    - Egyptian tomb bat, Taphozous perforatus LC
- Family: Nycteridae
  - Genus: Nycteris
    - Hairy slit-faced bat, Nycteris hispida LC
    - Large-eared slit-faced bat, Nycteris macrotis LC
    - Egyptian slit-faced bat, Nycteris thebaica LC
- Family: Megadermatidae
  - Genus: Cardioderma
    - Heart-nosed bat, Cardioderma cor LC
  - Genus: Lavia
    - Yellow-winged bat, Lavia frons LC
- Family: Rhinolophidae
  - Subfamily: Rhinolophinae
    - Genus: Rhinolophus
      - Geoffroy's horseshoe bat, Rhinolophus clivosus LC
      - Rüppell's horseshoe bat, Rhinolophus fumigatus LC
      - Lander's horseshoe bat, Rhinolophus landeri LC
  - Subfamily: Hipposiderinae
    - Genus: Asellia
      - Trident leaf-nosed bat, Asellia tridens LC
    - Genus: Hipposideros
      - Aba roundleaf bat, Hipposideros abae NT
      - Sundevall's roundleaf bat, Hipposideros caffer LC
      - Noack's roundleaf bat, Hipposideros ruber LC

== Order: Pholidota (pangolins) ==
The order Pholidota comprises the eight species of pangolin. Pangolins are anteaters and have the powerful claws, elongated snout and long tongue seen in the other unrelated anteater species.

- Family: Manidae
  - Genus: Manis
    - Ground pangolin, Manis temminckii LR/nt

== Order: Cetacea (whales) ==
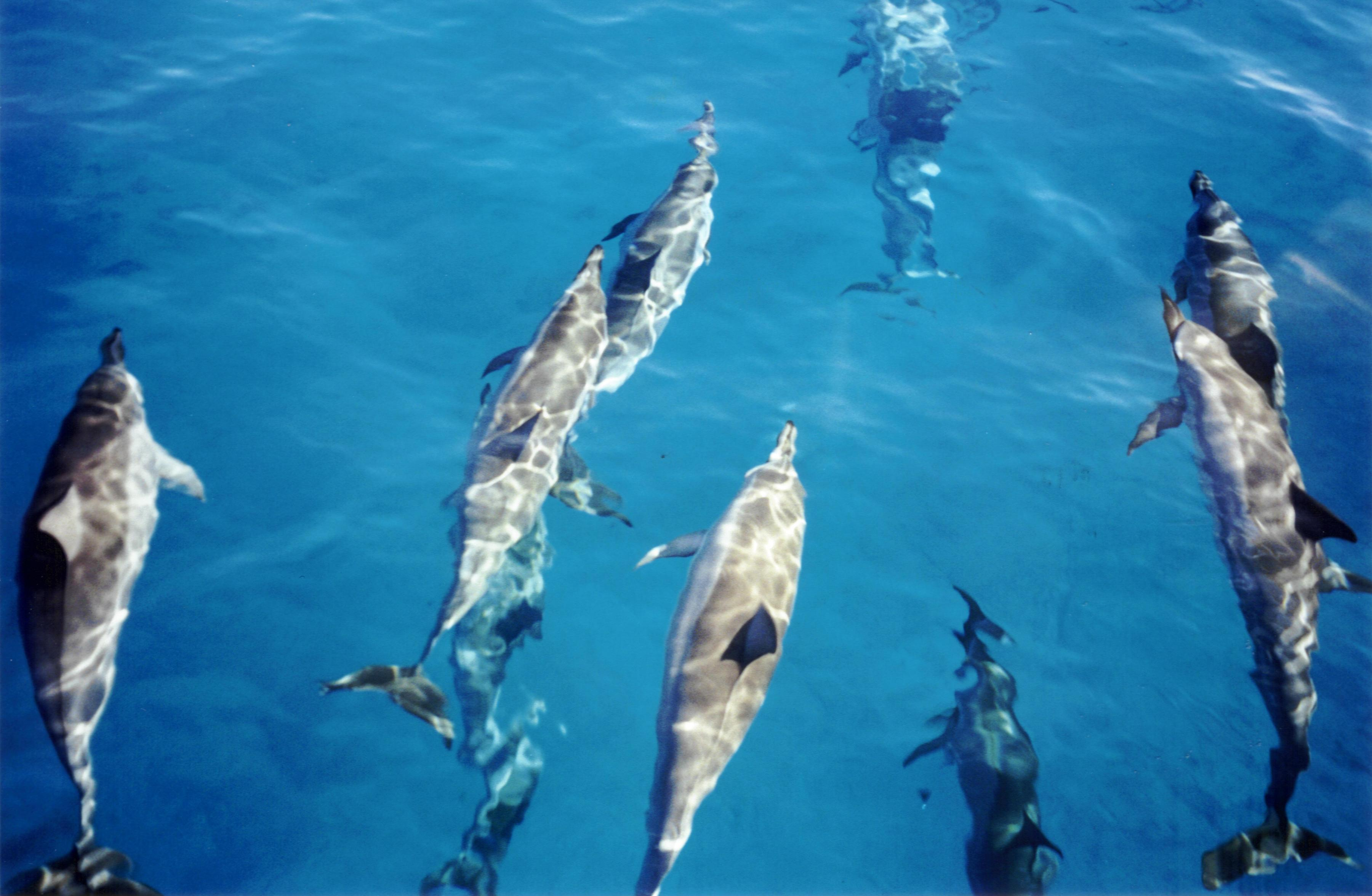
Spinner dolphins

The order Cetacea includes whales, dolphins and porpoises. They are the mammals most fully adapted to aquatic life with a spindle-shaped nearly hairless body, protected by a thick layer of blubber, and forelimbs and tail modified to provide propulsion underwater.

- Suborder: Odontoceti
  - Superfamily: Platanistoidea
    - Family: Delphinidae (marine dolphins)
      - Genus: Delphinus
        - Long-beaked common dolphin, Delphinus capensis DD
      - Genus: Globicephala
        - Short-finned pilot whale, Globicephala macrorhyncus DD
      - Genus: Grampus
        - Risso's dolphin, Grampus griseus DD
      - Genus: Orcinus
        - Killer whale, Orcinus orca DD
      - Genus: Sousa
        - Indian humpback dolphin, Sousa plumbea DD
      - Genus: Stenella
        - Pantropical spotted dolphin, Stenella attenuata DD
        - Striped dolphin, Stenella coeruleoalba DD
        - Spinner dolphin, Stenella longirostris DD
      - Genus: Steno
        - Rough-toothed dolphin, Steno bredanensis DD
      - Genus: Tursiops
        - Common bottlenose dolphin, Tursiops truncatus
        - Indo-Pacific bottlenose dolphin, Tursiops aduncus
  - Superfamily Ziphioidea
    - Family: Ziphidae (beaked whales)
      - Genus: Indopacetus
        - Tropical bottlenose whale, Indopacetus pacificus DD
      - Genus: Mesoplodon
        - Ginkgo-toothed beaked whale, Mesoplodon ginkgodens DD
        - Blainville's beaked whale, Mesoplodon densirostris DD

== Order: Carnivora (carnivorans) ==
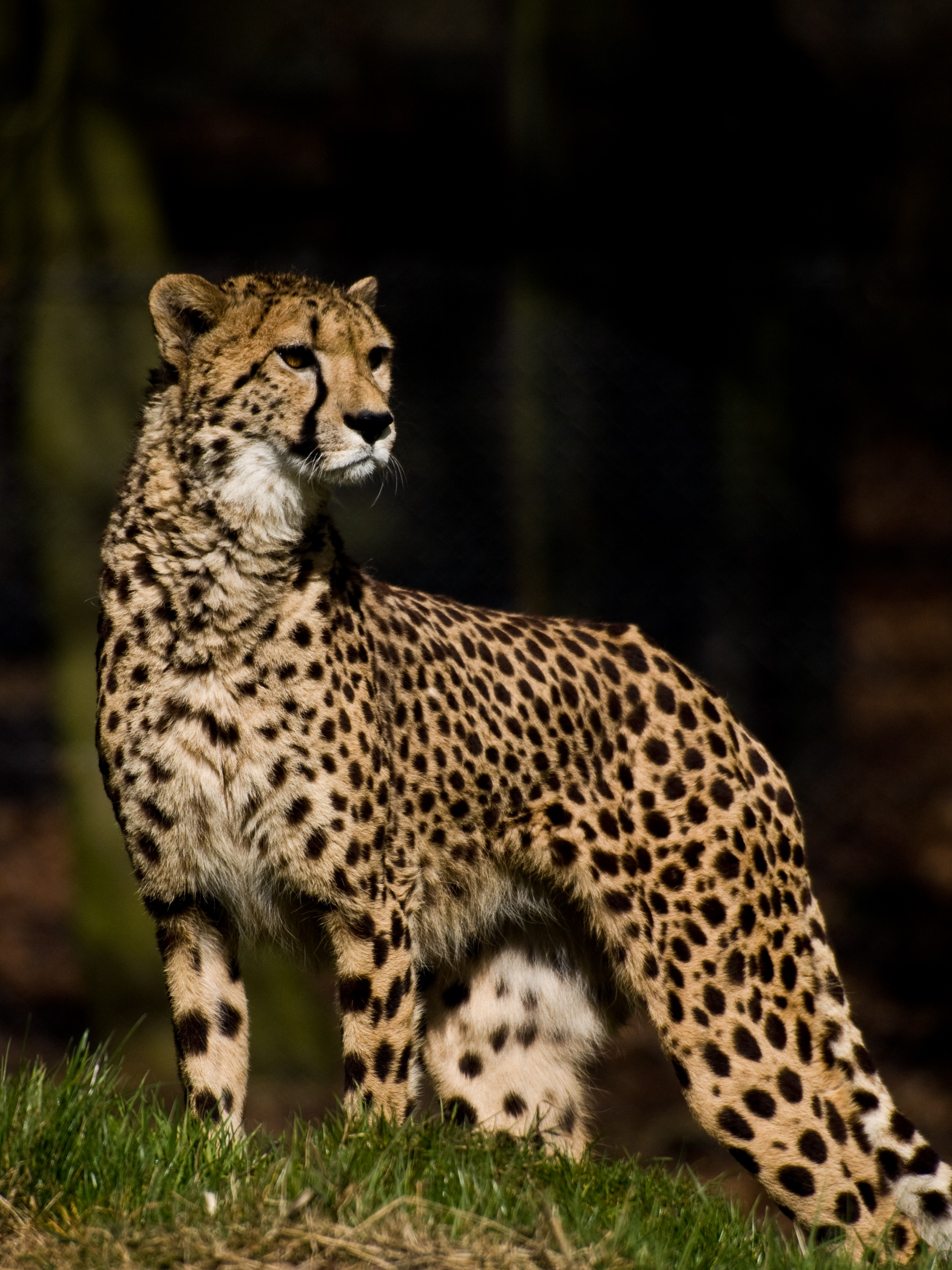
Cheetah

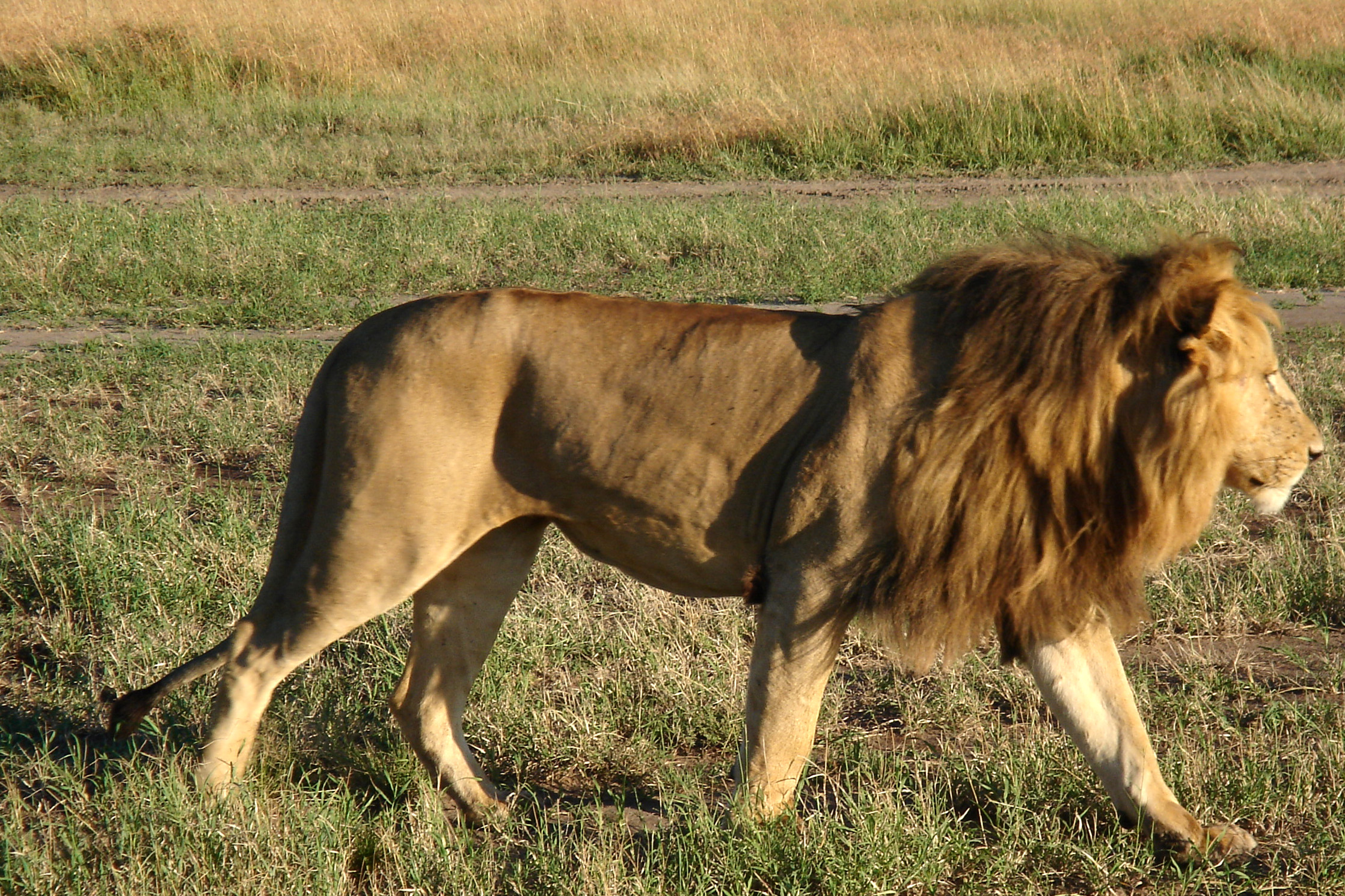
Lion

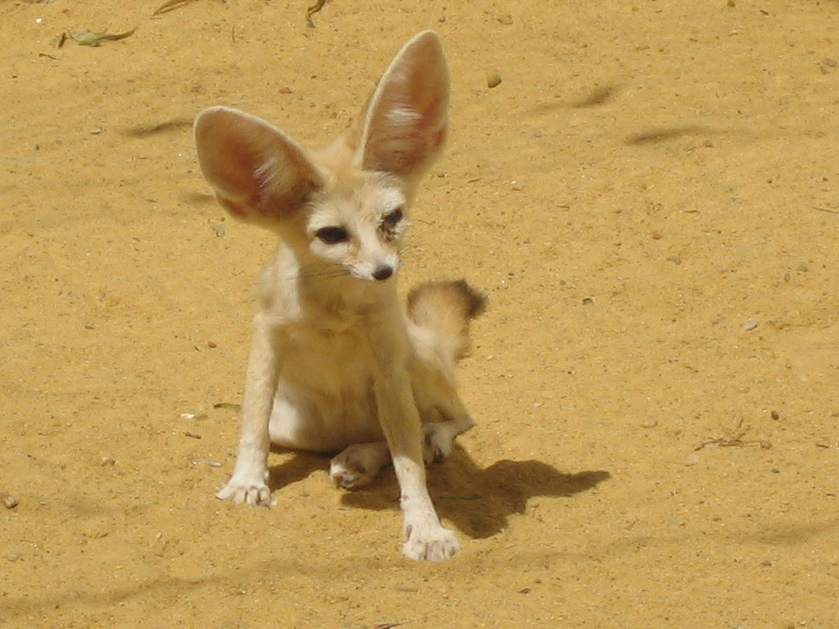
Fennec fox

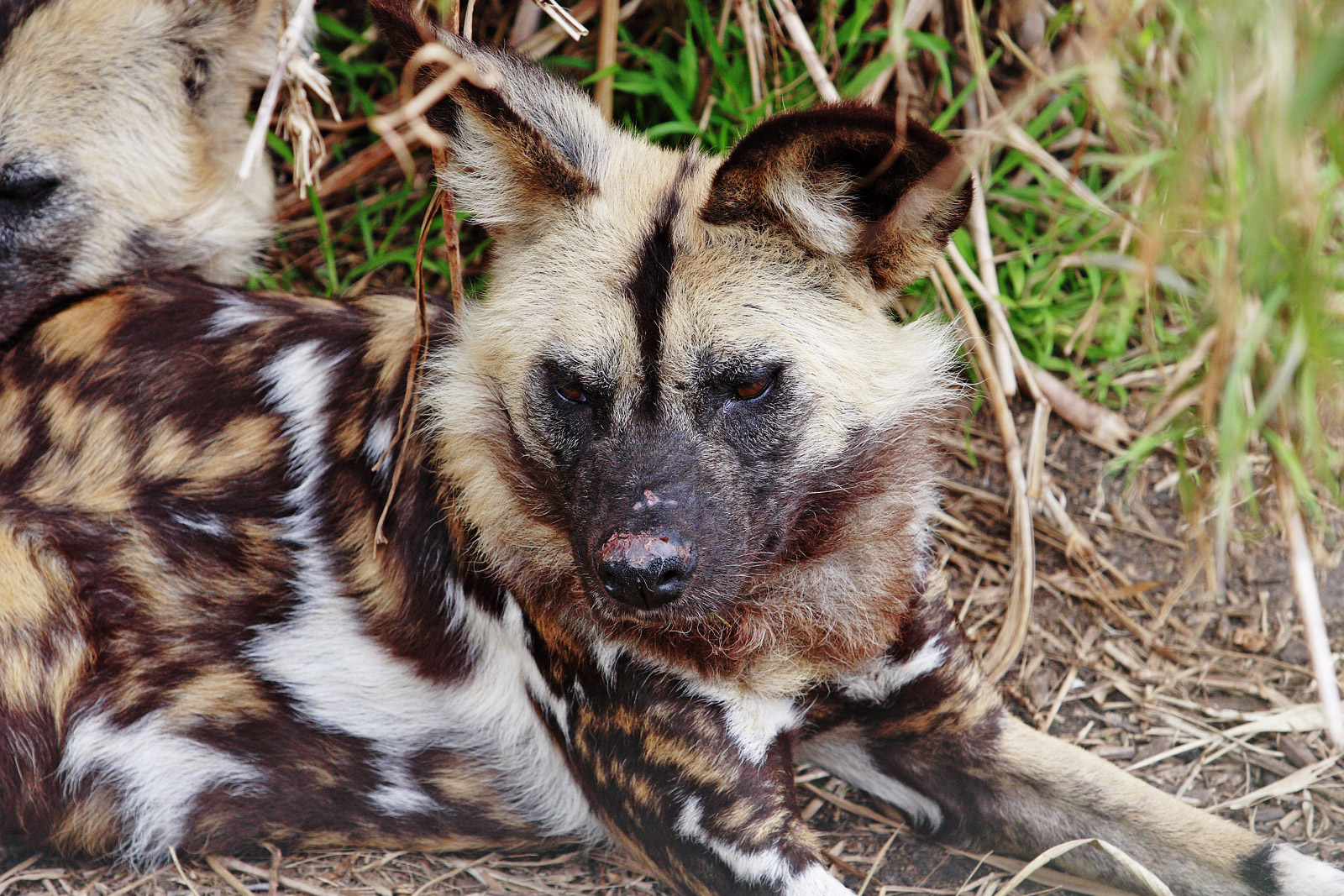
African wild dogs

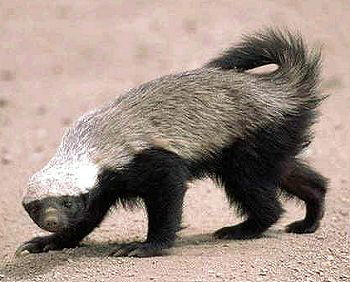
Honey badger

There are over 260 species of carnivorans, the majority of which feed primarily on meat. They have a characteristic skull shape and dentition.

- Suborder: Feliformia
  - Family: Felidae (cats)
    - Subfamily: Felinae
      - Genus: Acinonyx
        - Cheetah, Acinonyx jubatus VU
      - Genus: Caracal
        - Caracal, C. caracal LC
        - African golden cat, C. aurata VU presence uncertain
      - Genus: Felis
        - African wildcat, F. lybica LC, possibly resident
      - Genus: Leptailurus
        - Serval, Leptailurus serval LC
    - Subfamily: Pantherinae
      - Genus: Panthera
        - Lion, Panthera leo VU
        - Leopard, Panthera pardus VU
  - Family: Viverridae
    - Subfamily: Viverrinae
      - Genus: Civettictis
        - African civet, Civettictis civetta LC
      - Genus: Genetta
  - Family: Nandiniidae
  - Family: Herpestidae (mongooses)
    - Genus: Atilax
      - Marsh mongoose, Atilax paludinosus LC
    - Genus: Helogale
      - Common dwarf mongoose, Helogale parvula LC
    - Genus: Herpestes
      - Egyptian mongoose, Herpestes ichneumon LC
      - Common slender mongoose, Herpestes sanguineus LC
    - Genus: Ichneumia
      - White-tailed mongoose, Ichneumia albicauda LC
    - Genus: Mungos
      - Banded mongoose, Mungos mungo LC
  - Family: Hyaenidae (hyaenas)
    - Genus: Crocuta
      - Spotted hyena, Crocuta crocuta LC
    - Genus: Hyaena
      - Striped hyena, Hyaena hyaena NT
    - Genus: Proteles
      - Aardwolf, Proteles cristatus LC
- Suborder: Caniformia
  - Family: Canidae (dogs, foxes)
    - Genus: Vulpes
      - Pale fox, Vulpes pallida LC
      - Rueppell's fox, Vulpes rueppelli LC
      - Fennec, Vulpes zerda LC
    - Genus: Canis
      - African golden wolf, Canis lupaster LC
    - Genus: Lupulella
      - Side-striped jackal, L. adusta LC
      - Black-backed jackal, L. mesomelas LC
    - Genus: Lycaon
      - African wild dog, L. pictus EN
  - Family: Mustelidae (mustelids)
    - Genus: Ictonyx
      - Saharan striped polecat, Ictonyx libyca LC
      - Striped polecat, I. striatus LC
    - Genus: Mellivora
      - Honey badger, M. capensis LC
    - Genus: Hydrictis
      - Spotted-necked otter, H. maculicollis NT
    - Genus: Aonyx
      - African clawless otter, A. capensis NT

== Order: Perissodactyla (odd-toed ungulates) ==
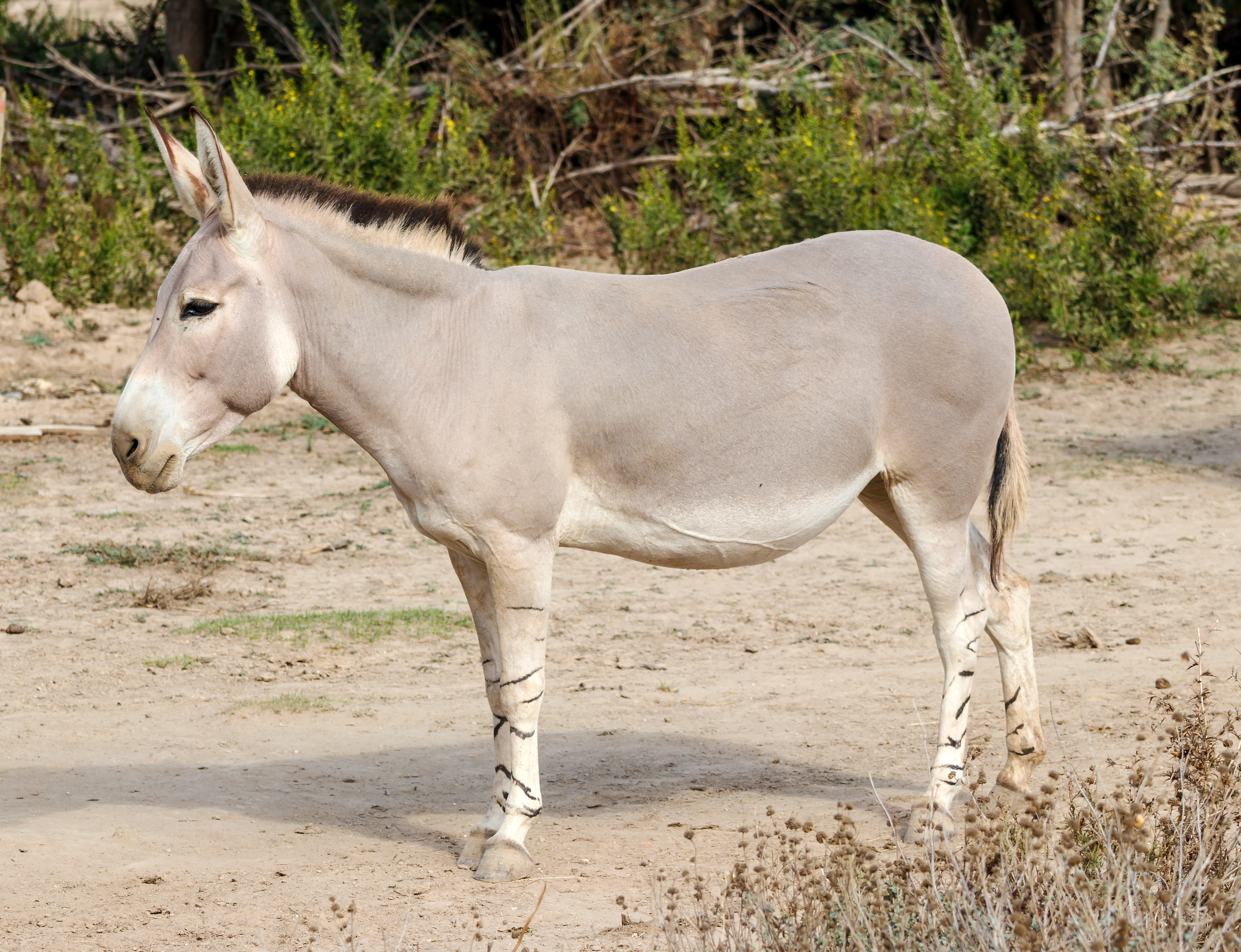
African wild ass

The odd-toed ungulates are browsing and grazing mammals. They are usually large to very large and have relatively simple stomachs and a large middle toe.

- Family: Equidae (horses etc.)
  - Genus: Equus
    - African wild ass, E. africanus CR presence uncertain
      - Nubian wild ass, E. a. africanusCR presence uncertain

== Order: Artiodactyla (even-toed ungulates) ==
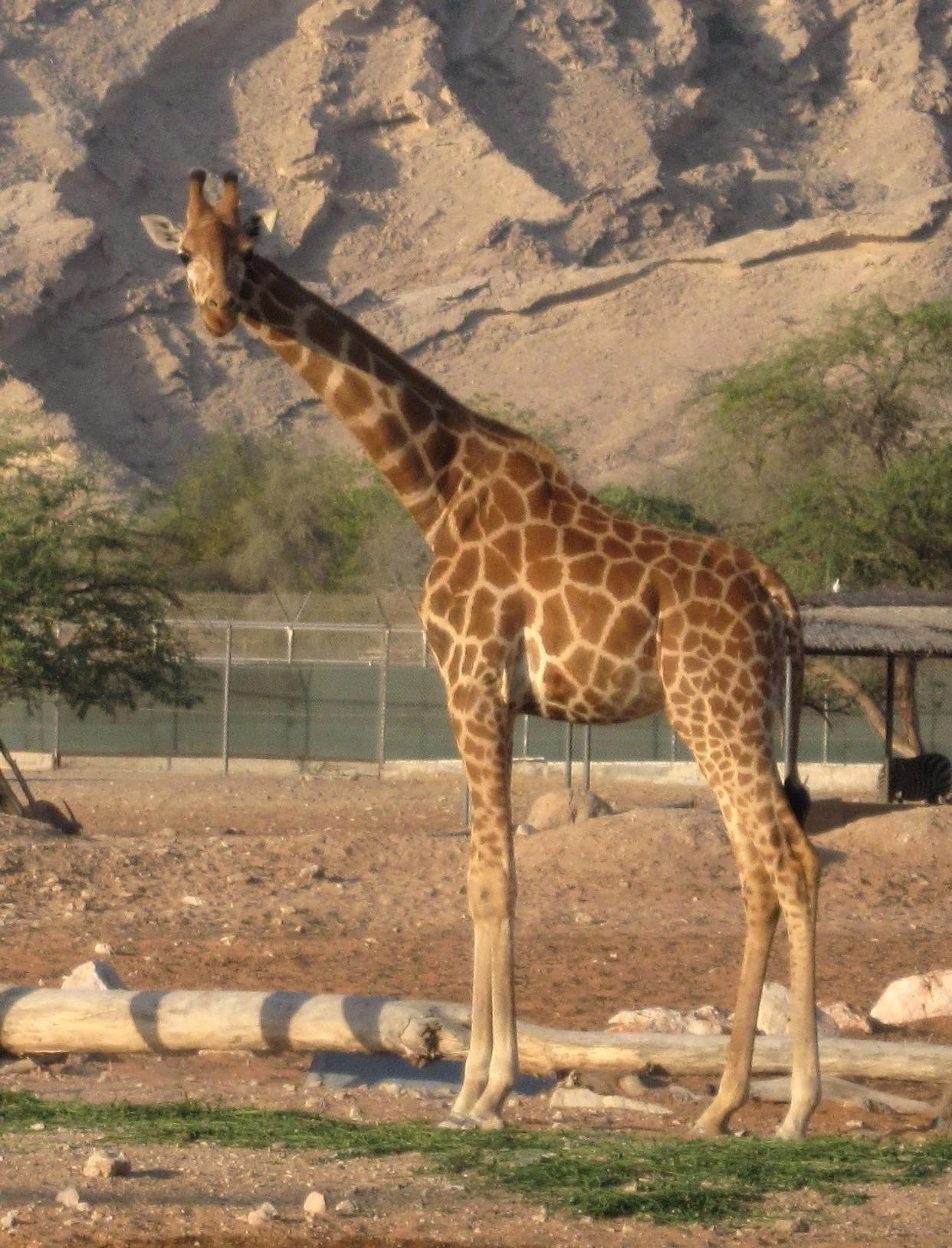
Nubian giraffe

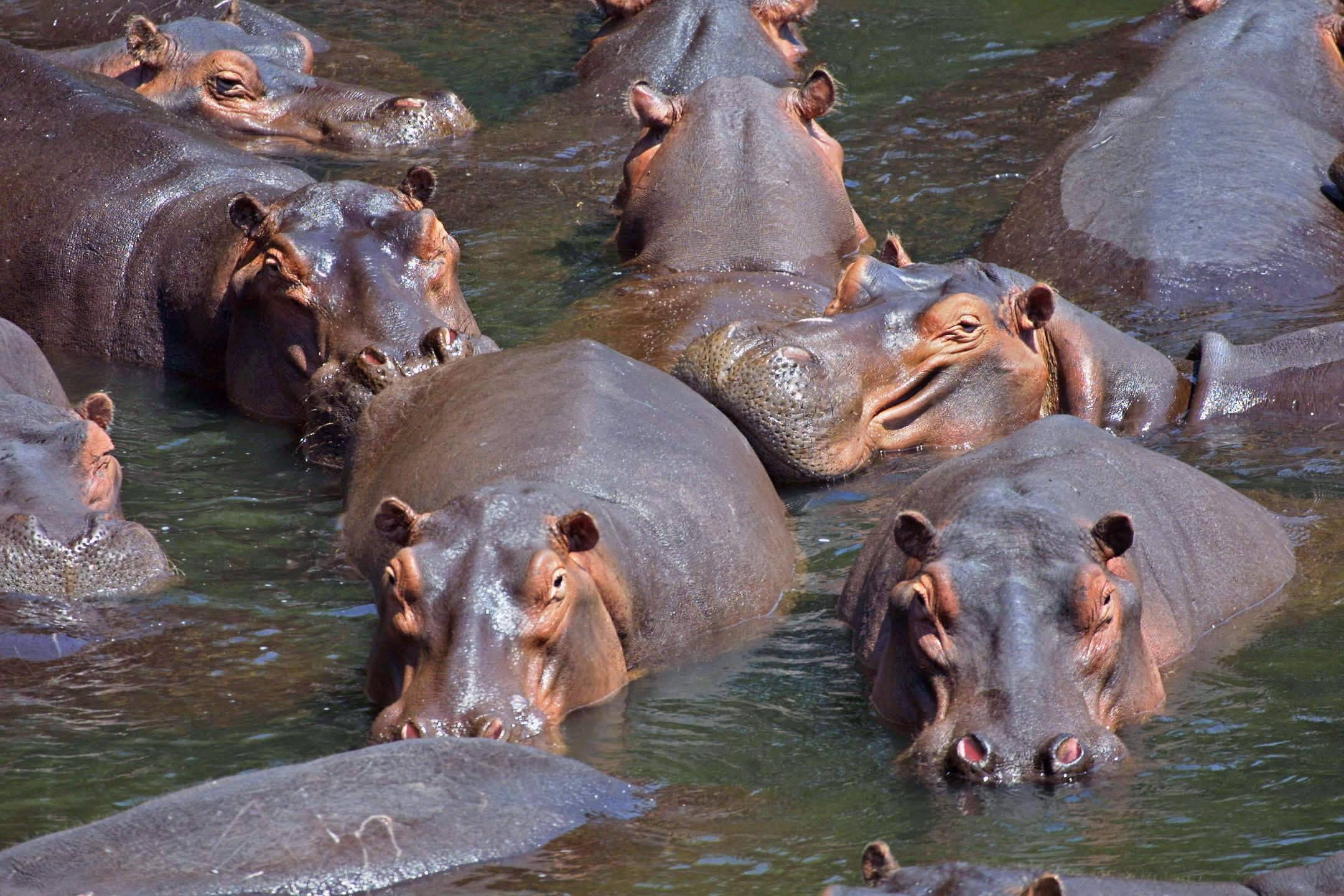
Hippopotamus

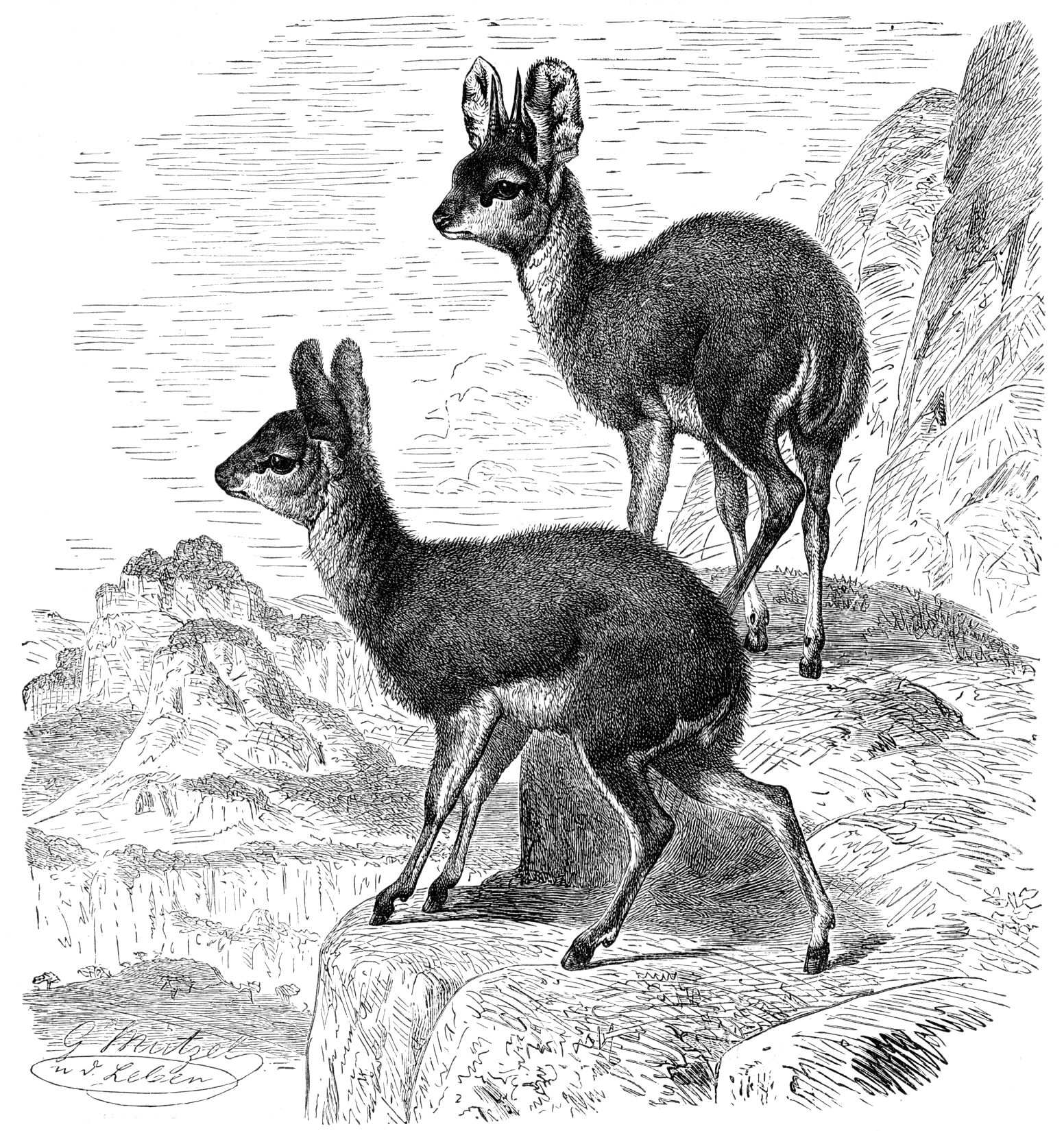
Klipspringer

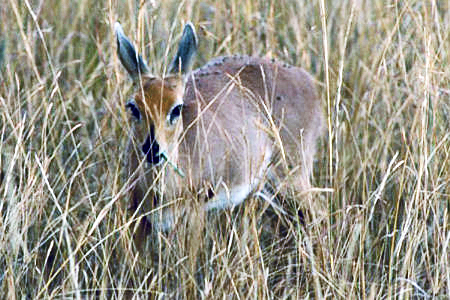
Oribi

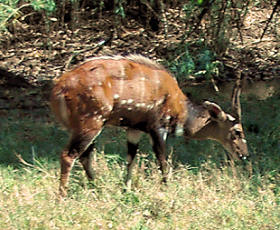
Bushbuck

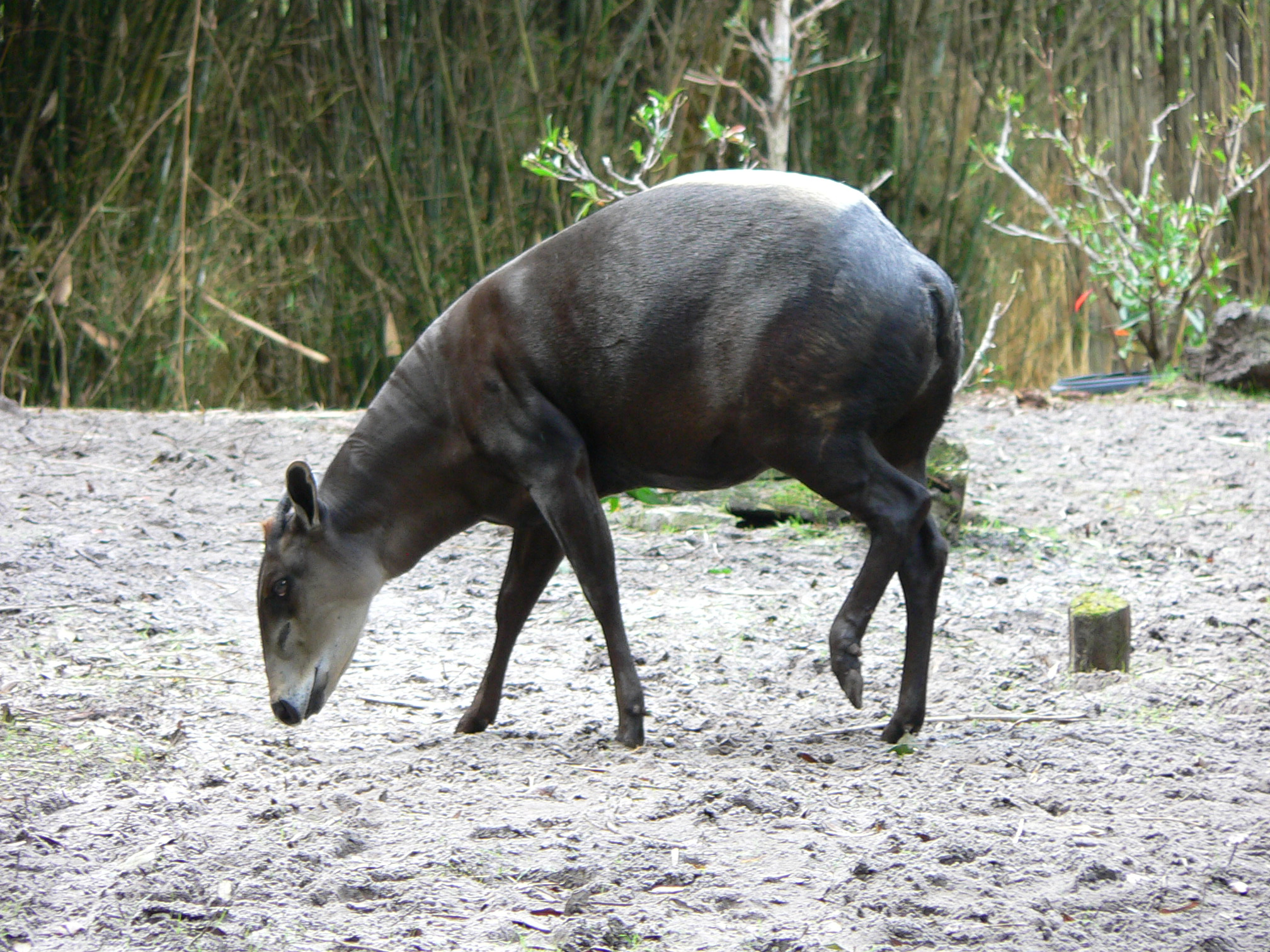
Yellow-backed duiker

The even-toed ungulates are ungulates whose weight is borne about equally by the third and fourth toes, rather than mostly or entirely by the third as in perissodactyls. There are about 220 artiodactyl species, including many that are of great economic importance to humans.

- Family: Suidae (pigs)
  - Subfamily: Phacochoerinae
    - Genus: Phacochoerus
      - Common warthog, Phacochoerus africanus LR/lc
    - Genus: Potamochoerus
      - Bushpig, Potamochoerus larvatus LR/lc
- Family: Hippopotamidae (hippopotamuses)
  - Genus: Hippopotamus
    - Hippopotamus, Hippopotamus amphibius VU
- Family: Giraffidae (giraffe, okapi)
  - Genus: Giraffa
    - Giraffe, Giraffa camelopardalis VU
- Family: Bovidae (cattle, antelope, sheep, goats)
  - Subfamily: Alcelaphinae
    - Genus: Alcelaphus
      - Hartebeest, Alcelaphus buselaphus LR/cd
    - Genus: Damaliscus
      - Topi, Damaliscus lunatus LR/cd
  - Subfamily: Antilopinae
    - Genus: Gazella
      - Dorcas gazelle, Gazella dorcas VU
      - Rhim gazelle, Gazella leptoceros EN
      - Red-fronted gazelle, Gazella rufifrons VU
      - Thomson's gazelle, Gazella thomsonii LR/cd
    - Genus: Madoqua
      - Salt's dik-dik, Madoqua saltiana LR/lc
    - Genus: Nanger
      - Dama gazelle, N. dama CR extirpated
      - Soemmerring's gazelle, N. soemmerringii VU
    - Genus: Oreotragus
      - Klipspringer, Oreotragus oreotragus LR/cd
    - Genus: Ourebia
      - Oribi, Ourebia ourebi
  - Subfamily: Bovinae
    - Genus: Syncerus
      - African buffalo, Syncerus caffer
    - Genus: Tragelaphus
      - Giant eland, Tragelaphus derbianus
      - Bushbuck, Tragelaphus scriptus
      - Sitatunga, Tragelaphus spekii
      - Greater kudu, Tragelaphus strepsiceros
  - Subfamily: Caprinae
    - Genus: Ammotragus
      - Barbary sheep, Ammotragus lervia VU
    - Genus: Capra
      - Nubian ibex, C. nubiana VU
  - Subfamily: Cephalophinae
    - Genus: Cephalophus
      - Blue duiker, Cephalophus monticola
      - Red-flanked duiker, Cephalophus rufilatus LR/cd
      - Yellow-backed duiker, Cephalophus silvicultor LR/nt
    - Genus: Sylvicapra
      - Common duiker, Sylvicapra grimmia LR/lc
  - Subfamily: Reduncinae
    - Genus: Kobus
      - Waterbuck, Kobus ellipsiprymnus LR/cd
      - Kob, Kobus kob LR/cd
      - Nile lechwe, Kobus megaceros LR/nt
    - Genus: Redunca
      - Bohor reedbuck, Redunca redunca LR/cd

== Locally extinct ==
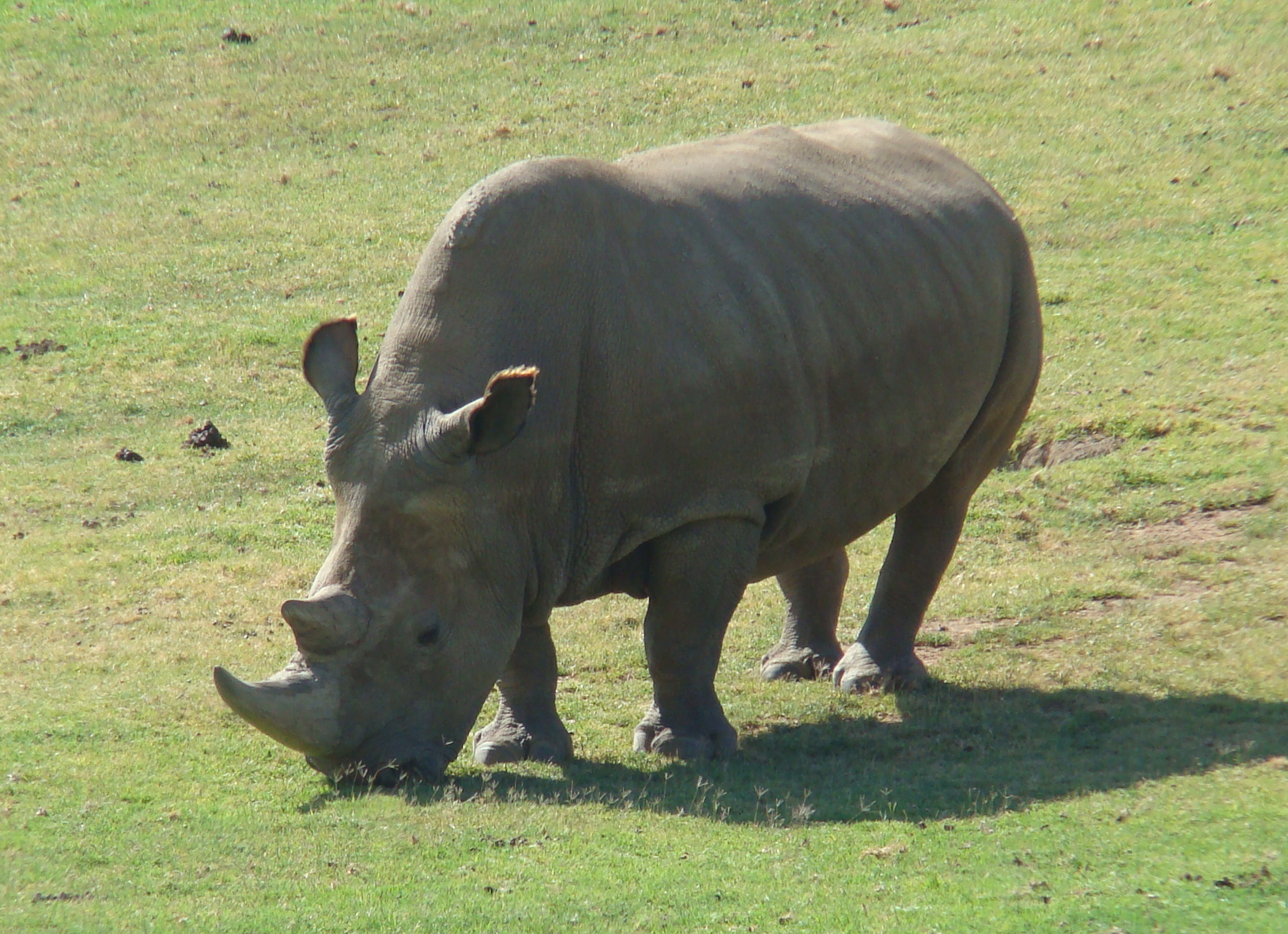
Northern white rhinoceros

The following species are locally extinct in Sudan, but continue to live elsewhere:

- Addax, Addax nasomaculatus CR
- East African oryx, Oryx beisa EN (possibly extirpated)
- Scimitar oryx, Oryx dammah EN
- Dama gazelle, Nanger dama CR
- Grévy's zebra, Equus grevyi EN
- Northern white rhinoceros, Ceratotherium simum cottoni EW ? CR
- Wild boar, Sus scrofa LC

== See also ==
- List of chordate orders
- List of fauna of Sudan and South Sudan
- Lists of mammals by region
- List of prehistoric mammals
- Mammal classification
- List of mammals described in the 2000s
