= Vivacious gerbil =

Vivacious gerbil is the common name of two species. Those gerbils also shared the scientific name Gerbillus vivax before each was recognized as separate species.

- Gerbillus nanus - Balochistan gerbil, dwarf gerbil
- Gerbillus amoenus - pleasant gerbil
