= Somali pygmy gerbil =

Conservation status
- Data Deficient (IUCN 3.1)

Scientific classification
- Kingdom: Animalia
- Phylum: Chordata
- Class: Mammalia
- Order: Rodentia
- Family: Muridae
- Subfamily: Gerbillinae
- Tribe: Gerbillini
- Subtribe: Gerbillina
- Genus: Microdillus; Thomas, 1910
- Species: M. peeli

Binomial name
- Microdillus peeli (de Winton, 1898)

Species of rodent

The Somali pygmy gerbil (Microdillus peeli) is a species of rodent in the family Muridae. It is the only species in the genus Microdillus. It is found only in Somalia. Its natural habitat is subtropical or tropical dry shrubland.
