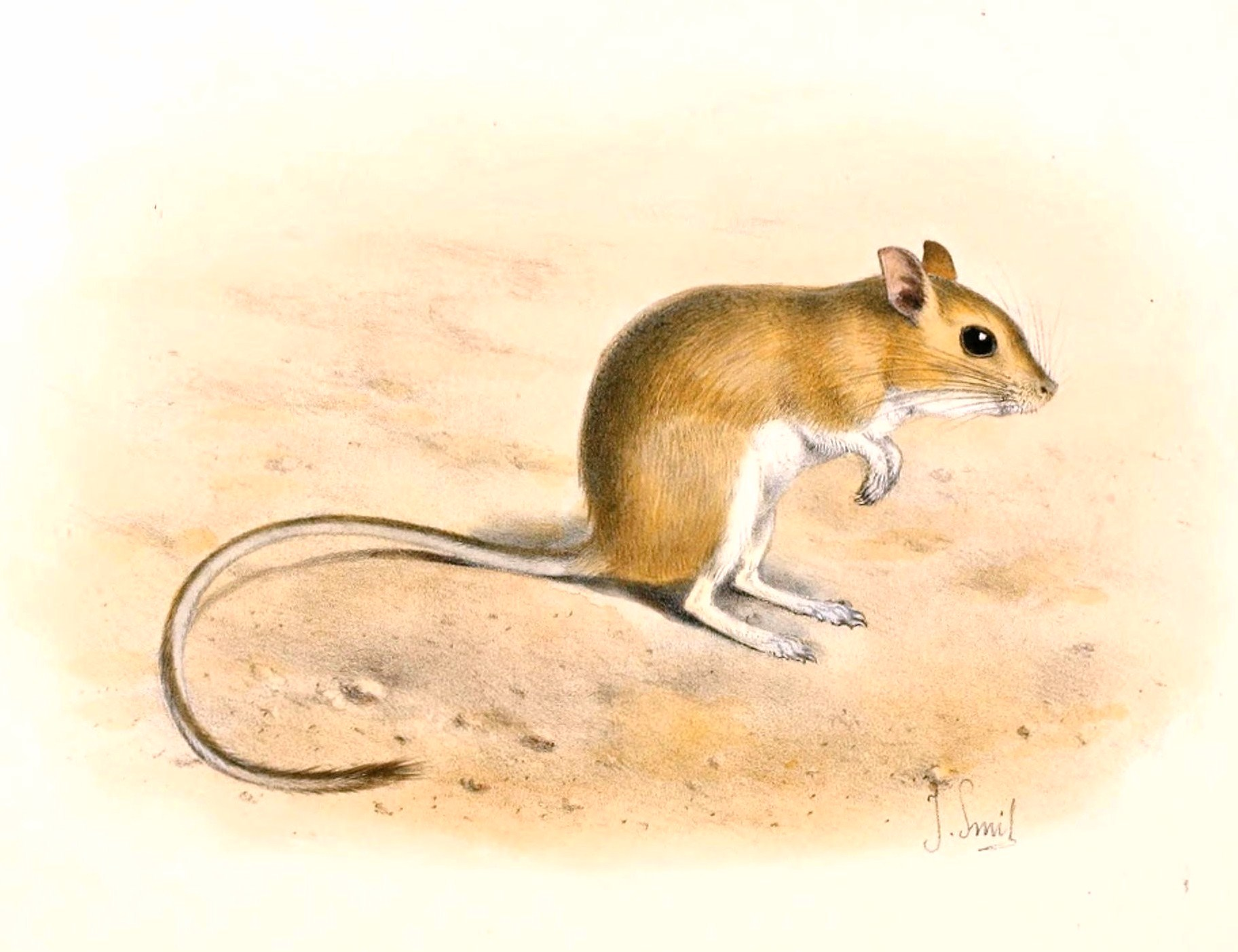

Conservation status
- Least Concern (IUCN 3.1)

Scientific classification
- Kingdom: Animalia
- Phylum: Chordata
- Class: Mammalia
- Order: Rodentia
- Family: Muridae
- Genus: Dipodillus
- Species: D. watersi

Binomial name
- Dipodillus watersi de Winton, 1901

Synonyms
- Gerbillus watersi Gerbillus juliani (St Leger, 1935)

= Waters's gerbil =

Species of rodent

Waters's gerbil (Dipodillus watersi) is distributed mainly in Sudan, Somalia, and Djibouti.
