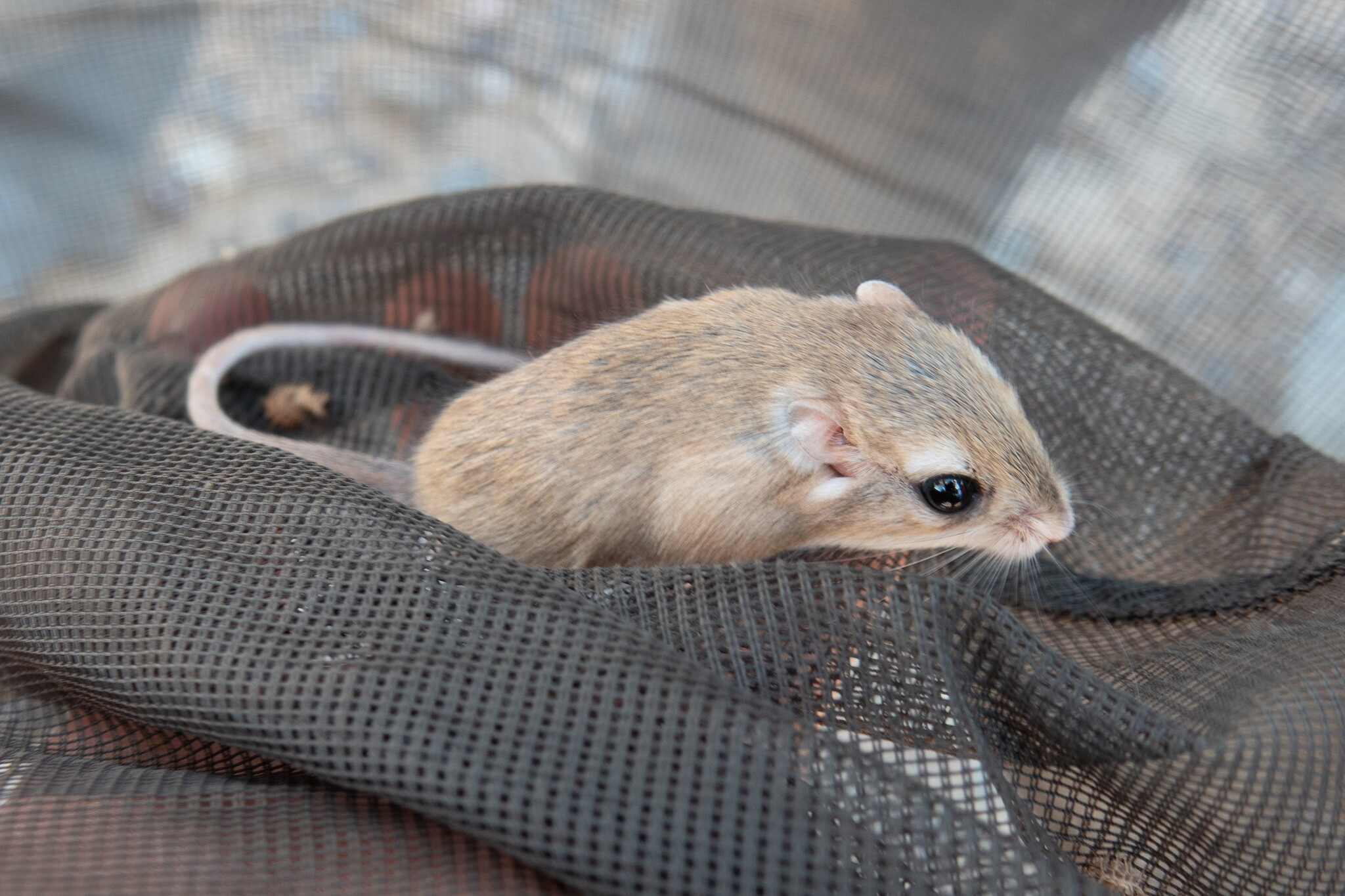
- Errachidia Province, Morocco

Conservation status
- Least Concern (IUCN 3.1)

Scientific classification
- Kingdom: Animalia
- Phylum: Chordata
- Class: Mammalia
- Infraclass: Placentalia
- Order: Rodentia
- Family: Muridae
- Genus: Gerbillus
- Species: G. amoenus

Binomial name
- Gerbillus amoenus (de Winton, 1902)

Synonyms
- Gerbillus vivax (partim)

= Pleasant gerbil =

Pleasant gerbil Temporal range: Pliocene - Recent

Species of rodent

The pleasant gerbil (Gerbillus amoenus) is a species of rodent found mainly in Libya and Egypt, and possibly Mauritania to Tunisia. This species is about 6 cm in body length, with a brown agouti-style coat, a white belly and a very long tail. It is also known as the charming dipodil.

== Pleasant gerbils as pets ==
Pleasant gerbils are kept and bred in captivity in Europe. They were introduced as pets to the United Kingdom in 2002.
