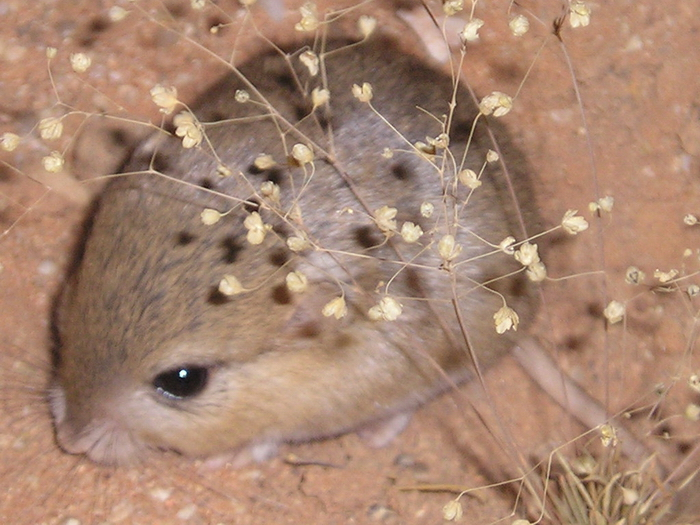

Conservation status
- Least Concern (IUCN 3.1)

Scientific classification
- Kingdom: Animalia
- Phylum: Chordata
- Class: Mammalia
- Order: Rodentia
- Family: Muridae
- Genus: Desmodillus; Thomas & Schwann, 1904
- Species: D. auricularis

Binomial name
- Desmodillus auricularis (Smith, 1834)

= Cape short-eared gerbil =

Cape short-eared gerbil Temporal range: Pleistocene to Recent

Species of rodent

The Cape short-eared gerbil (Desmodillus auricularis) is a species of rodent in the family Muridae. It is the only species in the genus Desmodillus. It is found in Angola, Botswana, Namibia, and South Africa. Its natural habitats are hot deserts and temperate desert. It is the only gerbil whose tail is shorter than the combined length of its head and body. There are some variation in color, but its white patches at the bases of its ears differentiates it from other species. Diet consists mainly of grass-seeds, and occasionally greenery and insects. It weighs 50g and its total length is 20 cm. It nests in burrows, often with many tunnels. It hoards food inside the burrows or buries it outside nearby.
