= Congo gerbil =

Conservation status
- Least Concern (IUCN 3.1)

Scientific classification
- Kingdom: Animalia
- Phylum: Chordata
- Class: Mammalia
- Order: Rodentia
- Family: Muridae
- Genus: Taterillus
- Species: T. congicus

Binomial name
- Taterillus congicus Thomas, 1915

Species of rodent

The Congo gerbil or Congo tateril (Taterillus congicus) is a species of rodent found in Cameroon, Central African Republic, Chad, Democratic Republic of the Congo, Sudan, and possibly Uganda. Its natural habitat is dry savanna.
