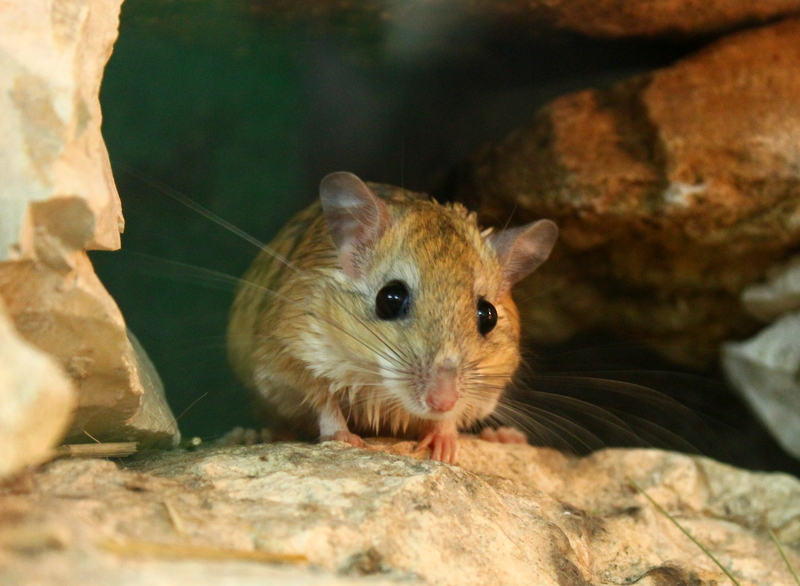

Conservation status
- Least Concern (IUCN 3.1)

Scientific classification
- Kingdom: Animalia
- Phylum: Chordata
- Class: Mammalia
- Order: Rodentia
- Family: Muridae
- Genus: Sekeetamys; Ellerman, 1947
- Species: S. calurus

Binomial name
- Sekeetamys calurus (Thomas, 1892)

= Bushy-tailed jird =

Species of rodent

The bushy-tailed jird or bushy-tailed dipodil (Sekeetamys calurus) is a species of rodent in the family Muridae. It is the only species in the genus Sekeetamys. It is found in Egypt, Israel, Jordan, Saudi Arabia, and Sudan. Its natural habitat is rocky areas.

== Description ==
The bushy-tailed jird is a large mouse-like rodent with a bushy tail in the subfamily Gerbillinae. It has a length of between 229 and 292 millimetres (9.0 and 11.5 in) and a tail of between 131 and 164 millimetres (5.2 and 6.5 in). Its average weight is between 27 and 50 grams (0.95 and 1.76 oz). The ears are large and there are pale patches around the eyes. Dorsally, the hairs are yellowish-brown tipped with black, with the flanks being rather paler than the back. There is a sharp demarcation line between the flanks and the whitish underparts. The tail is yellowish-brown at its base, the rest being greyish-black except for the usually white tip. The tail is well furred throughout its length and held upright. This bushy tail is unique among small rodents in Egypt except for the Asian garden dormouse (Eliomys melanurus). The legs are slender and the hind feet are long, with hairless soles.

== Distribution and habitat ==
The bushy-tailed jird occurs in eastern Egypt, the Sinai Peninsula, southern Israel and southern Jordan. Its natural habitat is arid and semiarid localities where the rainfall is typically less than 100 millimetres (4 in) per year. It seems to be expanding its range northwards in Israel; whereas its northern limit used to be the Tze'elim Stream near Masada in southern Israel, it now occurs at Ein Gedi, west of the Dead Sea.

== Status ==
The bushy-tailed jird is an uncommon species but the population trend is stable and there are no particular threats so the International Union for Conservation of Nature has rated its conservation status as "least concern".
