= Pouched gerbil =

Pouched gerbil Temporal range: Late Pleistocene to Recent

Conservation status
- Least Concern (IUCN 3.1)

Scientific classification
- Kingdom: Animalia
- Phylum: Chordata
- Class: Mammalia
- Order: Rodentia
- Family: Muridae
- Genus: Desmodilliscus; Wettstein, 1916
- Species: D. braueri

Binomial name
- Desmodilliscus braueri Wettstein, 1916
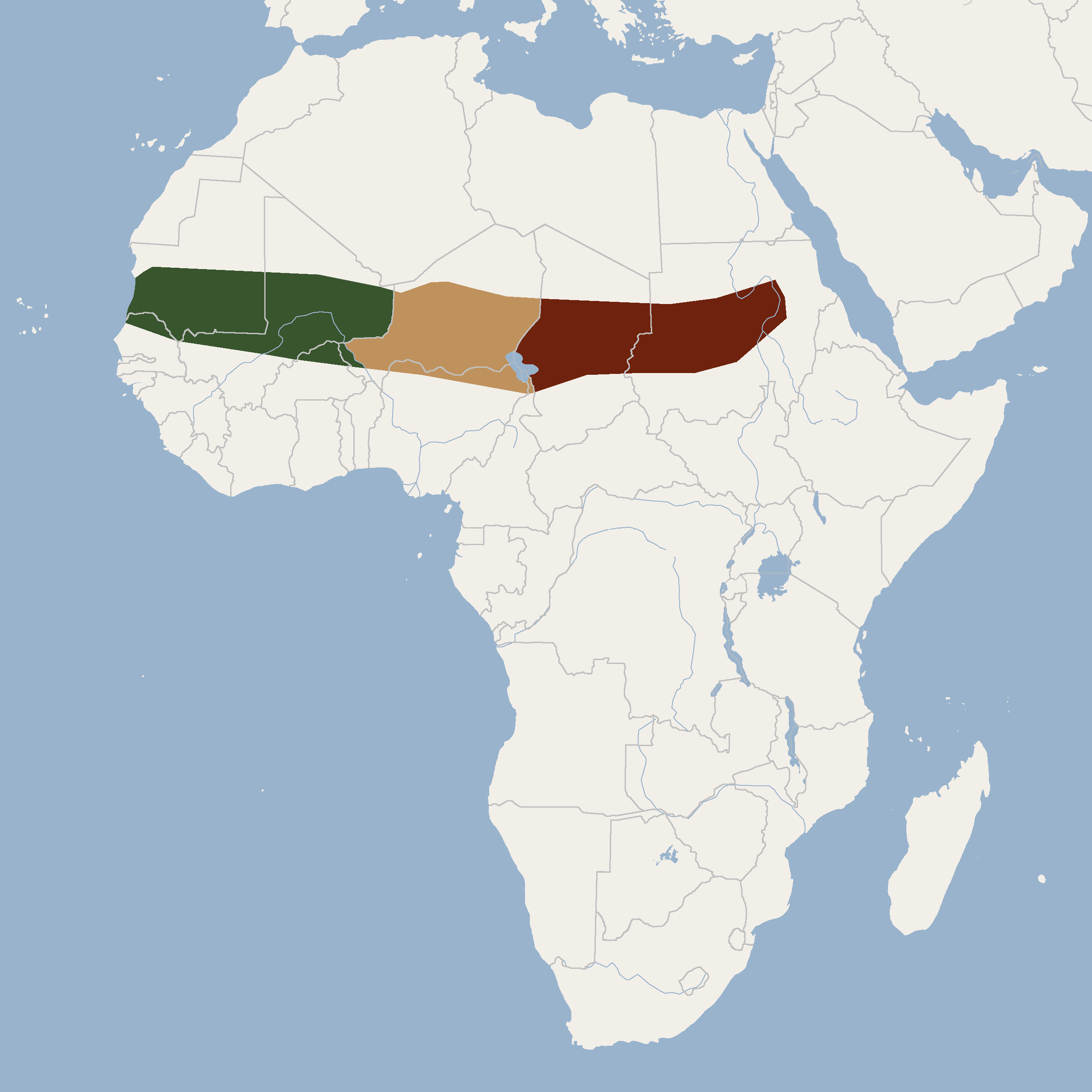
- D. b. braueri D. b. buchanani D. b. fuscus

Species of rodent

The pouched gerbil (Desmodilliscus braueri) is a species of rodent in the family Muridae. It is the only species in the genus Desmodilliscus and the subtribe Desmodilliscina.

It is found across western Africa from Mauritania east to Sudan. Its natural habitat is dry savanna.

This species is probably the smallest of the family Muridae. It weighs 6 to 14 grams (0.21 to 0.49 oz), its length is 4 to 8 cm (1.6 to 3.1 in) without the shorter, poorly haired tail.
