= William Edward de Winton =

British zoologist (1856–1922)

William Edward de Winton (6 September 1856 – 30 August 1922) was a British zoologist. He traveled widely, and discovered a number of previously undescribed cricetid species. His East Africa photo collection, from the late 1890s, is kept at the London Natural History Museum.
