= List of mammals of Somaliland =

This is a list of the mammal species recorded in Somaliland. There are 192 identified mammal species or subspecies in Somaliland, of which two are critically endangered, one is endangered, twelve are vulnerable, and four are near threatened.

The following tags are used to highlight each species' conservation status as assessed by the International Union for Conservation of Nature:

EX	Extinct	No reasonable doubt that the last individual has died.
EW	Extinct in the wild	Known only to survive in captivity or as a naturalized populations well outside its previous range.
CR	Critically endangered	The species is in imminent risk of extinction in the wild.
EN	Endangered	The species is facing an extremely high risk of extinction in the wild.
VU	Vulnerable	The species is facing a high risk of extinction in the wild.
NT	Near threatened	The species does not meet any of the criteria that would categorise it as risking extinction but it is likely to do so in the future.
LC	Least concern	There are no current identifiable risks to the species.
DD	Data deficient	There is inadequate information to make an assessment of the risks to this species.

== Order: Afrosoricida (tenrecs and golden moles) ==
The order Afrosoricida contains the golden moles of southern Africa and the tenrecs of Madagascar and Africa, two families of small mammals that were traditionally part of the order Insectivora.

- Family: Chrysochloridae
  - Subfamily: Amblysominae
    - Genus: Calcochloris
      - Somali golden mole, Calcochloris tytonis DD

== Order: Macroscelidea (elephant shrews) ==
Often called sengis, the elephant shrews or jumping shrews are native to southern Africa. Their common English name derives from their elongated flexible snout and their resemblance to the true shrews.

- Family: Macroscelididae (elephant-shrews)
  - Genus: Elephantulus
    - Somali elephant shrew, Elephantulus revoili DD
    - Rufous elephant shrew, Elephantulus rufescens LC

== Order: Tubulidentata (aardvarks) ==
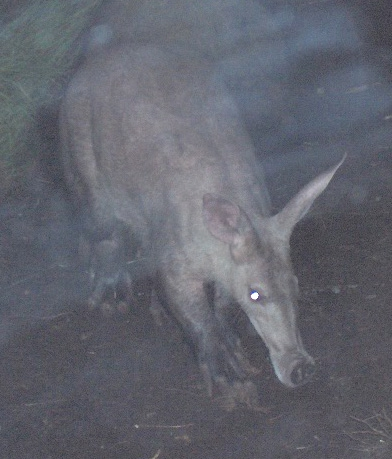
Aardvark

The order Tubulidentata consists of a single species, the aardvark. Tubulidentata are characterised by their teeth which lack a pulp cavity and form thin tubes which are continuously worn down and replaced.

- Family: Orycteropodidae
  - Genus: Orycteropus
    - Aardvark, Orycteropus afer LC

== Order: Hyracoidea (hyraxes) ==
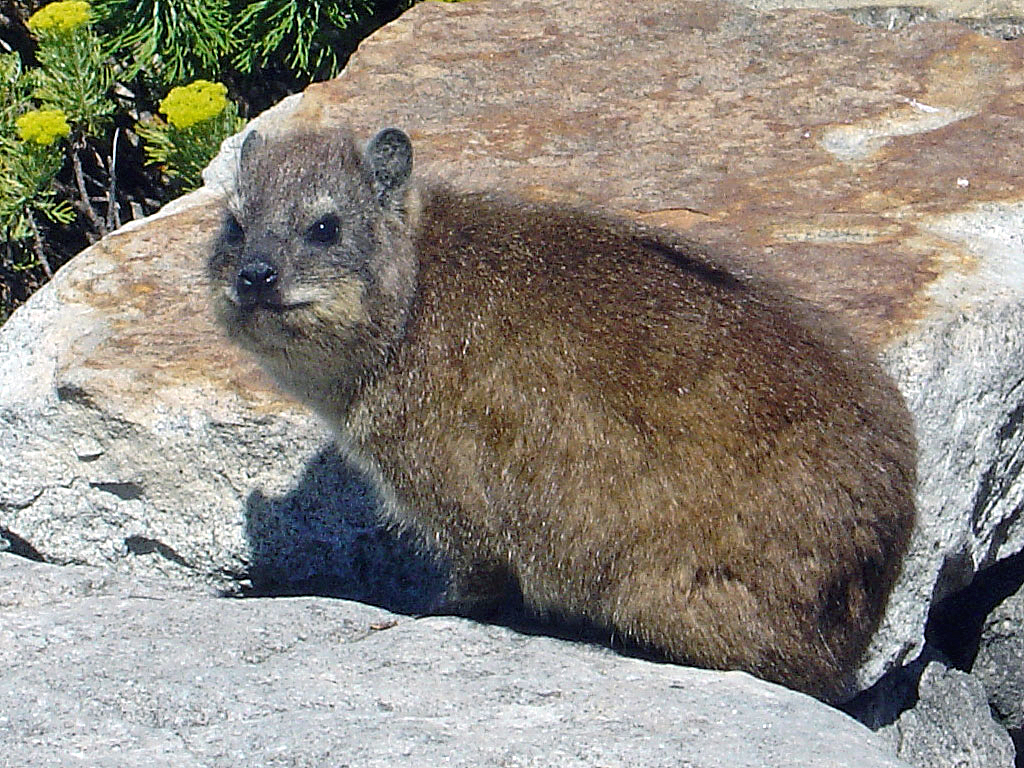
Cape hyrax

The hyraxes are any of four species of fairly small, thickset, herbivorous mammals in the order Hyracoidea. About the size of a domestic cat they are well-furred, with rounded bodies and a stumpy tail. They are native to Africa and the Middle East.

- Family: Procaviidae (hyraxes)
  - Genus: Heterohyrax
    - Yellow-spotted rock hyrax, Heterohyrax brucei LC
  - Genus: Procavia
    - Cape hyrax, Procavia capensis LC

== Order: Proboscidea (elephants) ==
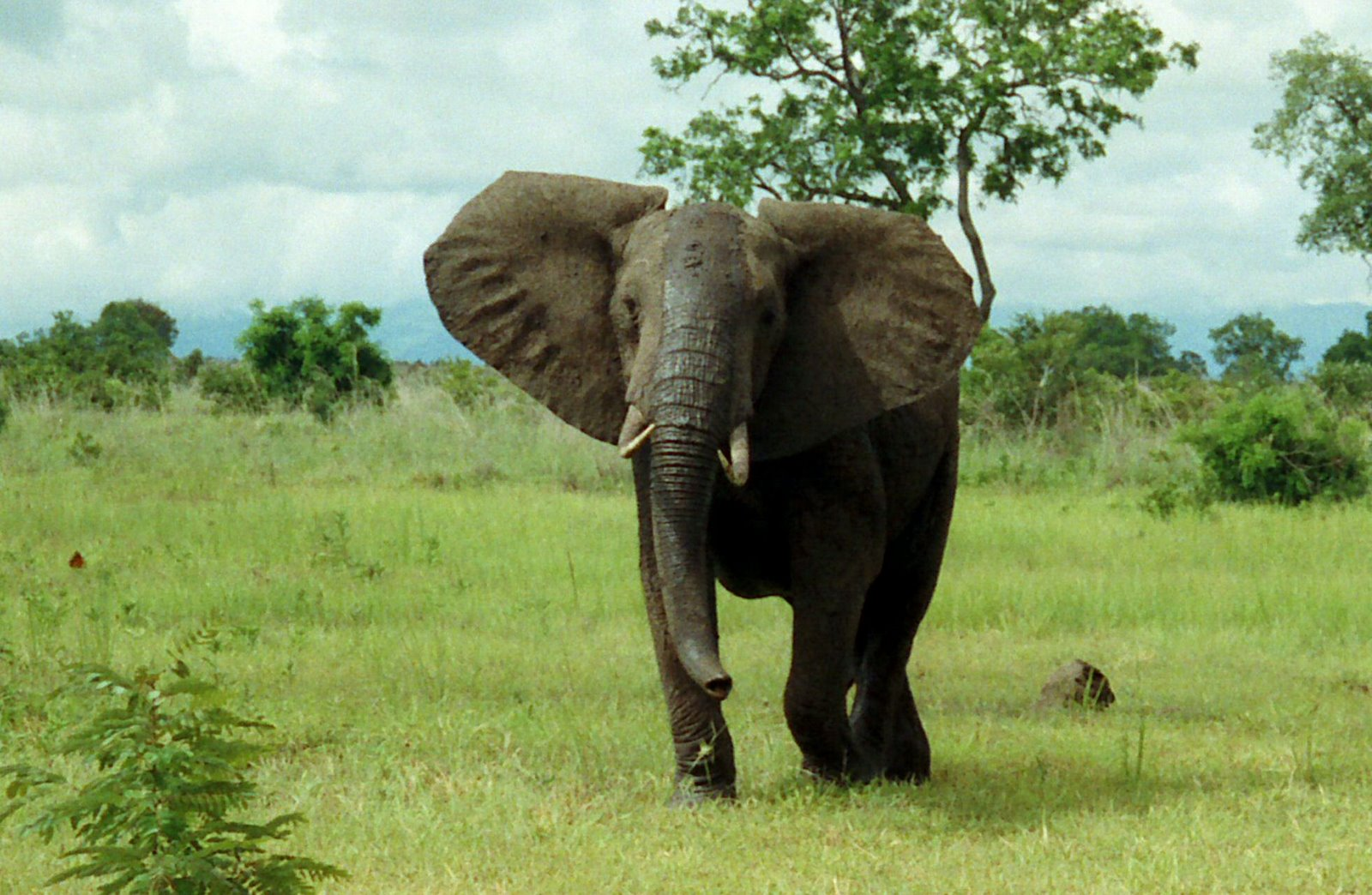
African bush elephant

The elephants comprise three living species and are the largest living land animals.

- Family: Elephantidae (elephants)
  - Genus: Loxodonta
    - African bush elephant, Loxodonta africana EN possibly extirpated

== Order: Sirenia (manatees and dugongs) ==
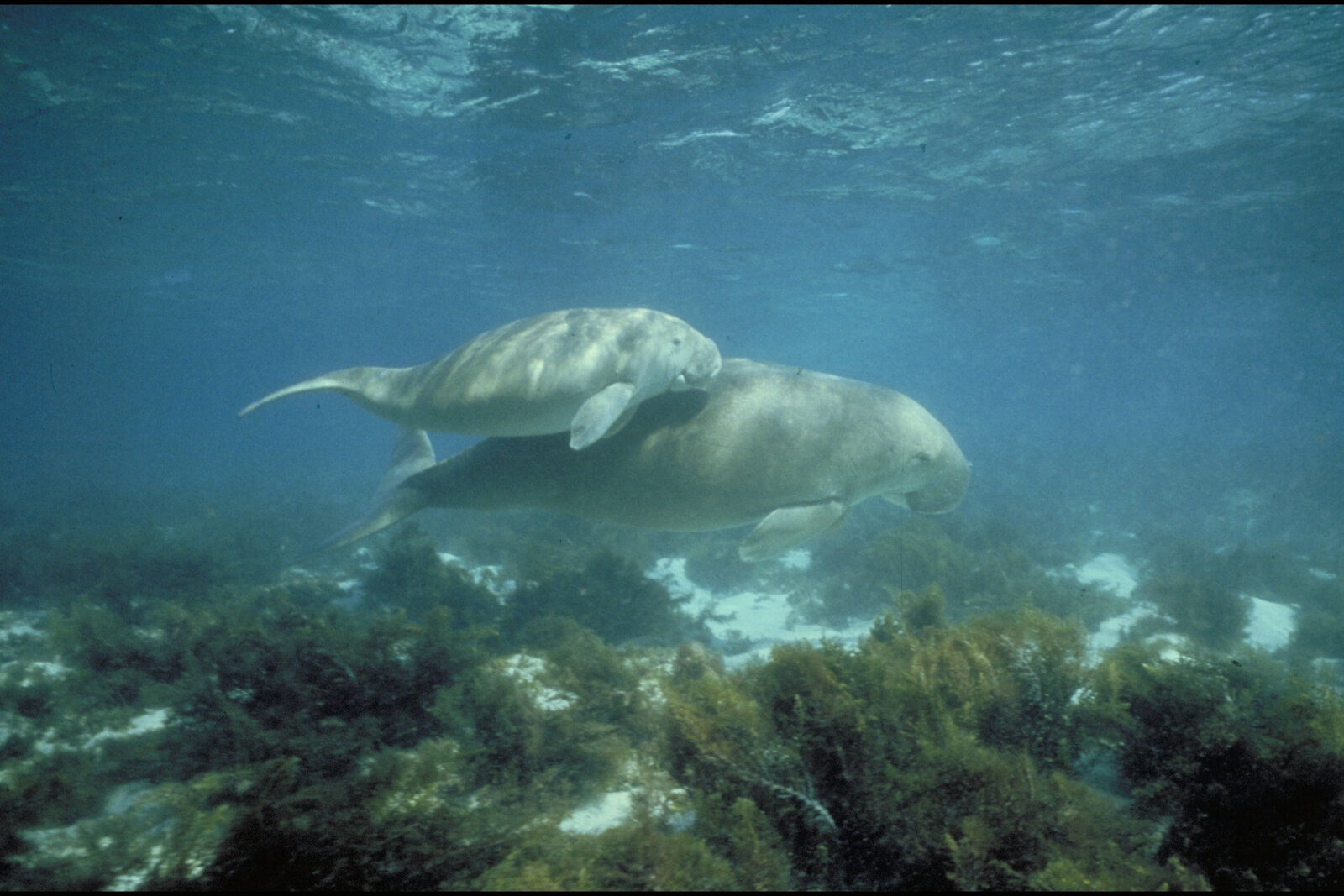
Dugongs

Sirenia is an order of fully aquatic, herbivorous mammals that inhabit rivers, estuaries, coastal marine waters, swamps, and marine wetlands. All four species are endangered.

- Family: Dugongidae
  - Genus: Dugong
    - Dugong, Dugong dugon VU

== Order: Primates ==
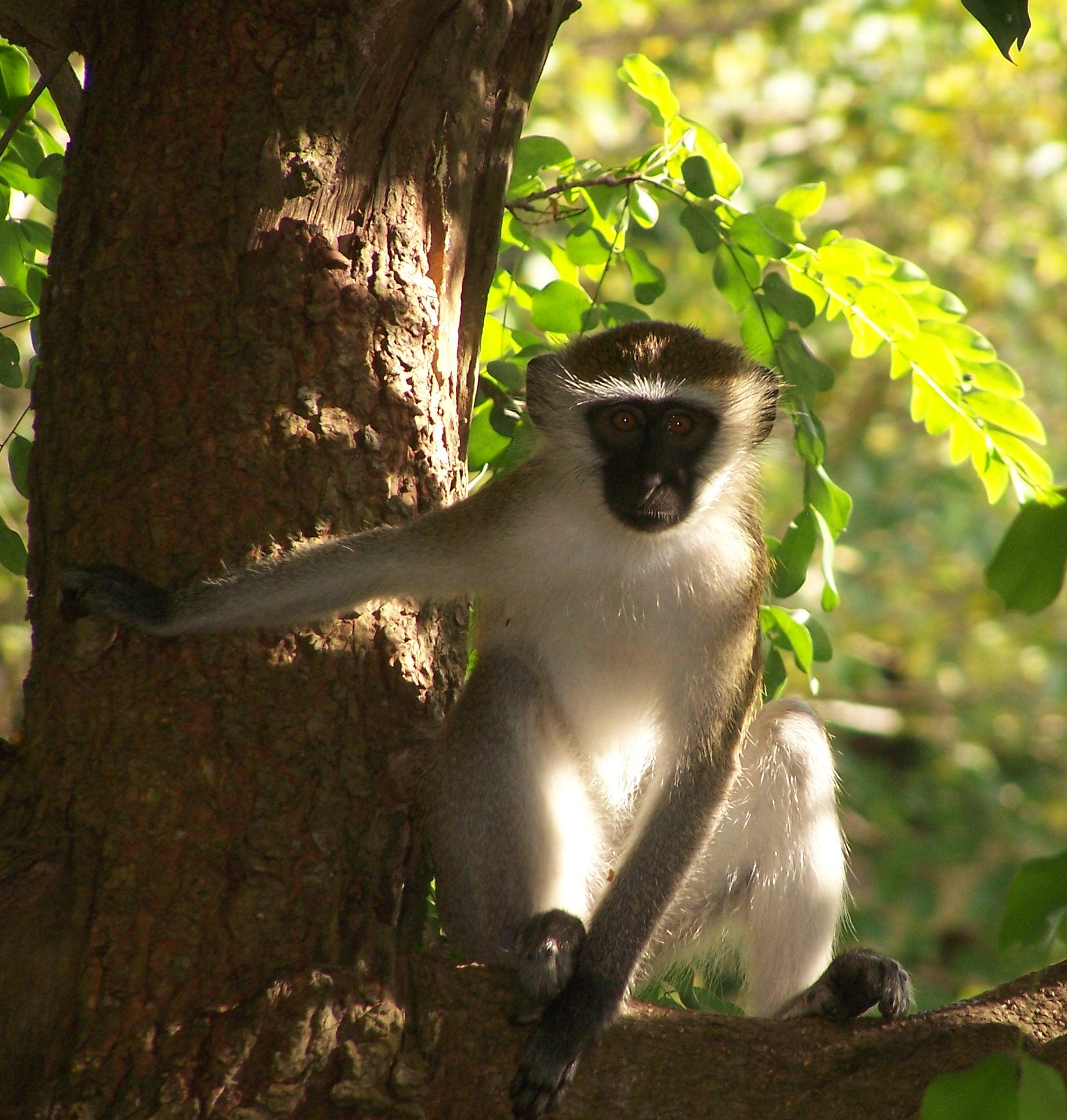
Vervet monkey

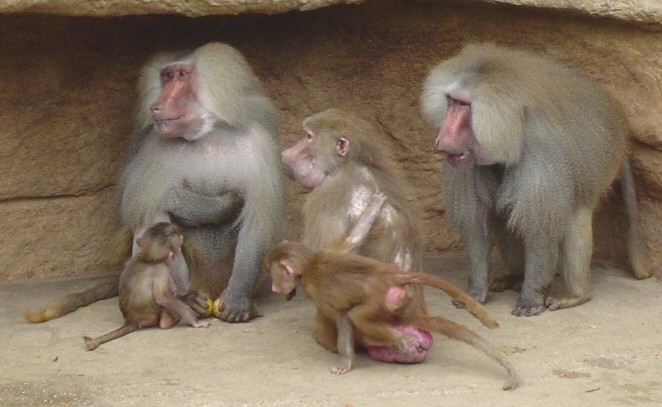
Hamadryas baboon

The order Primates contains humans and their closest relatives: lemurs, lorisoids, tarsiers, monkeys, and apes.

- Suborder: Strepsirrhini
  - Infraorder: Lemuriformes
    - Superfamily: Lorisoidea
      - Family: Galagidae
        - Genus: Galago
          - Somali bushbaby, Galago gallarum LR/nt
        - Genus: Galagoides
          - Zanzibar bushbaby, Galagoides zanzibaricus LR/nt
        - Genus: Otolemur
          - Northern greater galago, Otolemur garnettii LR/lc
- Suborder: Haplorhini
  - Infraorder: Simiiformes
    - Parvorder: Catarrhini
      - Superfamily: Cercopithecoidea
        - Family: Cercopithecidae (Old World monkeys)
          - Genus: Erythrocebus
            - Patas monkey, Erythrocebus patas LR/lc
          - Genus: Chlorocebus
            - Vervet monkey, Chlorocebus pygerythrus LR/lc
          - Genus: Cercopithecus
            - Blue monkey, Cercopithecus mitis LR/lc
          - Genus: Papio
            - Olive baboon, Papio anubis LR/lc
            - Yellow baboon, Papio cynocephalus LR/lc
            - Hamadryas baboon, Papio hamadryas LR/nt

== Order: Rodentia (rodents) ==
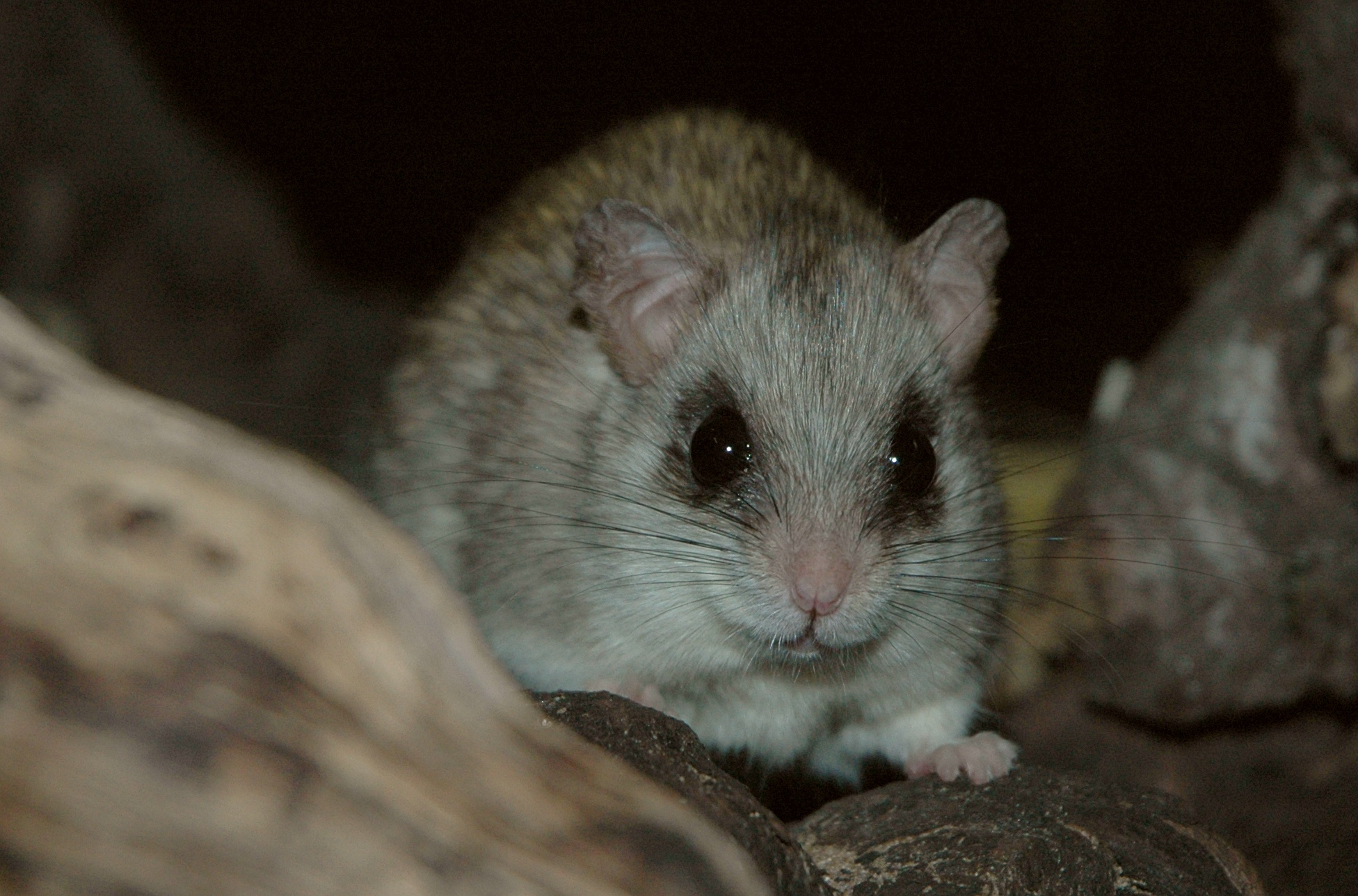
Acacia rat

Rodents make up the largest order of mammals, with over 40% of mammalian species. They have two incisors in the upper and lower jaw which grow continually and must be kept short by gnawing. Most rodents are small though the capybara can weigh up to 45 kg (99 lb).

- Suborder: Hystricognathi
  - Family: Bathyergidae
    - Genus: Heterocephalus
      - Naked mole-rat, Heterocephalus glaber LC
  - Family: Hystricidae (Old World porcupines)
    - Genus: Hystrix
      - Crested porcupine, Hystrix cristata LC
- Suborder: Sciurognathi
  - Family: Sciuridae (squirrels)
    - Subfamily: Xerinae
      - Tribe: Xerini
        - Genus: Xerus
          - Unstriped ground squirrel, Xerus rutilus LC
      - Tribe: Protoxerini
        - Genus: Paraxerus
          - Ochre bush squirrel, Paraxerus ochraceus LC
          - Red bush squirrel, Paraxerus palliatus LC
  - Family: Dipodidae (jerboas)
    - Subfamily: Dipodinae
      - Genus: Jaculus
        - Lesser Egyptian jerboa, Jaculus jaculus LC
  - Family: Spalacidae
    - Subfamily: Tachyoryctinae
      - Genus: Tachyoryctes
        - Northeast African mole-rat, Tachyoryctes splendens LC
  - Family: Nesomyidae
    - Subfamily: Cricetomyinae
      - Genus: Saccostomus
        - Mearns's pouched mouse, Saccostomus mearnsi LC
  - Family: Cricetidae
    - Subfamily: Lophiomyinae
      - Genus: Lophiomys
        - Maned rat, Lophiomys imhausi LC
  - Family: Muridae (mice, rats, voles, gerbils, hamsters, etc.)
    - Subfamily: Deomyinae
      - Genus: Acomys
        - Fiery spiny mouse, Acomys ignitus LC
        - Kemp's spiny mouse, Acomys kempi LC
        - Louise's spiny mouse, Acomys louisae LC
        - Mullah spiny mouse, Acomys mullah LC
        - Percival's spiny mouse, Acomys percivali LC
        - Wilson's spiny mouse, Acomys wilsoni LC
    - Subfamily: Gerbillinae
      - Genus: Ammodillus
        - Ammodile, Ammodillus imbellis DD
      - Genus: Gerbillus
        - Berbera gerbil, Gerbillus acticola DD
        - Brockman's gerbil, Gerbillus brockmani DD
        - Somalia gerbil, Gerbillus dunni DD
        - Waters's gerbil, Gerbillus juliani LC
        - Rosalinda gerbil, Gerbillus rosalinda DD
        - Least gerbil, Gerbillus ruberrimus LC
        - Somalian gerbil, Gerbillus somalicus DD
      - Genus: Microdillus
        - Somali pygmy gerbil, Microdillus peeli LC
      - Genus: Tatera
        - Black-tailed gerbil, Tatera nigricauda LC
        - Phillips's gerbil, Tatera phillipsi LC
        - Fringe-tailed gerbil, Tatera robusta LC
      - Genus: Taterillus
        - Harrington's gerbil, Taterillus harringtoni LC
    - Subfamily: Murinae
      - Genus: Arvicanthis
        - Neumann's grass rat, Arvicanthis neumanni DD
      - Genus: Grammomys
        - Gray-headed thicket rat, Grammomys caniceps DD
      - Genus: Mastomys
        - Natal multimammate mouse, Mastomys natalensis LC
      - Genus: Mus
        - Delicate mouse, Mus tenellus LC
      - Genus: Myomyscus
        - Brockman's Myomyscus, Myomyscus brockmani LC
      - Genus: Thallomys
        - Acacia rat, Thallomys paedulcus LC
  - Family: Ctenodactylidae
    - Genus: Pectinator
      - Speke's pectinator, Pectinator spekei DD

== Order: Lagomorpha (lagomorphs) ==
The lagomorphs comprise two families, Leporidae (hares and rabbits), and Ochotonidae (pikas). Though they can resemble rodents, and were classified as a superfamily in that order until the early 20th century, they have since been considered a separate order. They differ from rodents in a number of physical characteristics, such as having four incisors in the upper jaw rather than two.

- Family: Leporidae (rabbits, hares)
  - Genus: Lepus
    - Cape hare, Lepus capensis LR/lc
    - Abyssinian hare, Lepus habessinicus LR/lc

== Order: Erinaceomorpha (hedgehogs and gymnures) ==
The order Erinaceomorpha contains a single family, Erinaceidae, which comprise the hedgehogs and gymnures. The hedgehogs are easily recognised by their spines while gymnures look more like large rats.

- Family: Erinaceidae (hedgehogs)
  - Subfamily: Erinaceinae
    - Genus: Atelerix
      - Four-toed hedgehog, Atelerix albiventris LR/lc
      - Somali hedgehog, Atelerix sclateri LR/lc
    - Genus: Hemiechinus
      - Desert hedgehog, Hemiechinus aethiopicus LR/lc

== Order: Soricomorpha (shrews, moles, and solenodons) ==
The "shrew-forms" are insectivorous mammals. The shrews and solenodons closely resemble mice while the moles are stout-bodied burrowers.

- Family: Soricidae (shrews)
  - Subfamily: Crocidurinae
    - Genus: Crocidura
      - Greenwood's shrew, Crocidura greenwoodi LC
      - MacArthur's shrew, Crocidura macarthuri LC
      - Somali dwarf shrew, Crocidura nana DD
      - Desert musk shrew, Crocidura smithii LC
      - Somali shrew, Crocidura somalica LC
      - Savanna path shrew, Crocidura viaria LC
      - Voi shrew, Crocidura voi LC
      - Yankari shrew, Crocidura yankariensis LC

== Order: Chiroptera (bats) ==
The bats' most distinguishing feature is that their forelimbs are developed as wings, making them the only mammals capable of flight. Bat species account for about 20% of all mammals.

- Family: Pteropodidae (flying foxes, Old World fruit bats)
  - Subfamily: Pteropodinae
    - Genus: Eidolon
      - Straw-coloured fruit bat, Eidolon helvum LC
    - Genus: Epomophorus
      - East African epauletted fruit bat, Epomophorus minimus LC
      - Wahlberg's epauletted fruit bat, Epomophorus wahlbergi LC
- Family: Vespertilionidae
  - Subfamily: Vespertilioninae
    - Genus: Eptesicus
      - Botta's serotine, Eptesicus bottae LC
    - Genus: Glauconycteris
      - Butterfly bat, Glauconycteris variegata LC
    - Genus: Hypsugo
      - Eisentraut's pipistrelle, Hypsugo eisentrauti DD
    - Genus: Neoromicia
      - Cape serotine, Neoromicia capensis LC
      - Heller's pipistrelle, Neoromicia helios DD
      - Banana pipistrelle, Neoromicia nanus LC
      - Rendall's serotine, Neoromicia rendalli LC
      - Somali serotine, Neoromicia somalicus LC
    - Genus: Nycticeinops
      - Schlieffen's bat, Nycticeinops schlieffeni LC
    - Genus: Pipistrellus
      - Egyptian pipistrelle, Pipistrellus deserti LC
      - Kuhl's pipistrelle, Pipistrellus kuhlii LC
    - Genus: Scotoecus
      - White-bellied lesser house bat, Scotoecus albigula DD
      - Hinde's lesser house bat, Scotoecus hindei DD
      - Dark-winged lesser house bat, Scotoecus hirundo DD
    - Genus: Scotophilus
      - African yellow bat, Scotophilus dinganii LC
- Family: Rhinopomatidae
  - Genus: Rhinopoma
    - Lesser mouse-tailed bat, Rhinopoma hardwickei LC
    - Macinnes's mouse-tailed bat, Rhinopoma macinnesi VU
- Family: Molossidae
  - Genus: Chaerephon
    - Little free-tailed bat, Chaerephon pumila LC
  - Genus: Mops
    - Angolan free-tailed bat, Mops condylurus LC
- Family: Emballonuridae
  - Genus: Coleura
    - African sheath-tailed bat, Coleura afra LC
  - Genus: Taphozous
    - Hamilton's tomb bat, Taphozous hamiltoni NT
    - Mauritian tomb bat, Taphozous mauritianus LC
    - Naked-rumped tomb bat, Taphozous nudiventris LC
    - Egyptian tomb bat, Taphozous perforatus LC
- Family: Nycteridae
  - Genus: Nycteris
    - Andersen's slit-faced bat, Nycteris aurita DD
    - Hairy slit-faced bat, Nycteris hispida LC
    - Parissi's slit-faced bat, Nycteris parisii DD
    - Egyptian slit-faced bat, Nycteris thebaica LC
- Family: Megadermatidae
  - Genus: Cardioderma
    - Heart-nosed bat, Cardioderma cor LC
  - Genus: Lavia
    - Yellow-winged bat, Lavia frons LC
- Family: Rhinolophidae
  - Subfamily: Rhinolophinae
    - Genus: Rhinolophus
      - Blasius's horseshoe bat, Rhinolophus blasii NT
      - Geoffroy's horseshoe bat, Rhinolophus clivosus LC
      - Eloquent horseshoe bat, Rhinolophus eloquens DD
      - Rüppell's horseshoe bat, Rhinolophus fumigatus LC
      - Hildebrandt's horseshoe bat, Rhinolophus hildebrandti LC
      - Lander's horseshoe bat, Rhinolophus landeri LC
  - Subfamily: Hipposiderinae
    - Genus: Asellia
      - Trident leaf-nosed bat, Asellia tridens LC
    - Genus: Hipposideros
      - Sundevall's roundleaf bat, Hipposideros caffer LC
      - Commerson's roundleaf bat, Hipposideros marungensis NT
      - Ethiopian large-eared roundleaf bat, Hipposideros megalotis NT
    - Genus: Triaenops
      - Persian trident bat, Triaenops persicus LC

== Order: Pholidota (pangolins) ==
The order Pholidota comprises the eight species of pangolin. Pangolins are anteaters and have the powerful claws, elongated snout and long tongue seen in the other unrelated anteater species.

- Family: Manidae
  - Genus: Manis
    - Ground pangolin, Manis temminckii LR/nt

== Order: Cetacea (whales) ==
The order Cetacea includes whales, dolphins and porpoises. They are the mammals most fully adapted to aquatic life with a spindle-shaped nearly hairless body, protected by a thick layer of blubber, and forelimbs and tail modified to provide propulsion underwater.

- Suborder: Mysticeti (baleen whales)
  - Family: Balaenopteridae (rorquals)
    - Subfamily: Balaenopterinae
      - Genus: Balaenoptera
        - Common minke whale, Balaenoptera acutorostrata LC
        - Sei whale, Balaenoptera borealis EN
        - Bryde's whale, Balaenoptera edeni DD
        - Blue whale, Balaenoptera musculus EN
        - Fin whale, Balaenoptera physalus EN
    - Subfamily: Megapterinae
      - Genus: Megaptera
        - Humpback whale, Megaptera novaeangliae CR (Arabian Sea population)
- Suborder: Odontoceti (toothed whales)
  - Superfamily: Platanistoidea
    - Family: Physeteridae (sperm whales)
      - Genus: Physeter
        - Sperm whale, Physeter macrocephalus VU
    - Family: Kogiidae
      - Genus: Kogia
        - Pygmy sperm whale, Kogia breviceps LR/lc
        - Dwarf sperm whale, Kogia sima LR/lc
    - Family: Ziphidae (beaked whales)
      - Subfamily: Hyperoodontinae
        - Genus: Indopacetus
          - Longman's beaked whale, Indopacetus pacificus DD
        - Genus: Ziphius
          - Cuvier's beaked whale, Ziphius cavirostris DD
        - Genus: Mesoplodon
          - Blainville's beaked whale, Mesoplodon densirostris DD
          - Ginkgo-toothed beaked whale, Mesoplodon ginkgodens DD
    - Family: Delphinidae (marine dolphins)
      - Genus: Steno
        - Rough-toothed dolphin, Steno bredanensis DD
      - Genus: Sousa
        - Indian humpback dolphin, Sousa plumbea DD
      - Genus: Tursiops
        - Indo-Pacific bottlenose dolphin, Tursiops aduncus DD
        - Common bottlenose dolphin, Tursiops truncatus DD
      - Genus: Stenella
        - Pantropical spotted dolphin, Stenella attenuata LR/cd
        - Striped dolphin, Stenella coeruleoalba LR/cd
        - Spinner dolphin, Stenella longirostris LR/cd
      - Genus: Lagenodelphis
        - Fraser's dolphin, Lagenodelphis hosei DD
      - Genus: Grampus
        - Risso's dolphin, Grampus griseus DD
      - Genus: Feresa
        - Pygmy killer whale, Feresa attenuata DD
      - Genus: Pseudorca
        - False killer whale, Pseudorca crassidens LR/lc
      - Genus: Orcinus
        - Orca, Orcinus orca LR/cd
      - Genus: Globicephala
        - Short-finned pilot whale, Globicephala macrorhynchus LR/cd
      - Genus: Peponocephala
        - Melon-headed whale, Peponocephala electra DD

== Order: Carnivora (carnivorans) ==
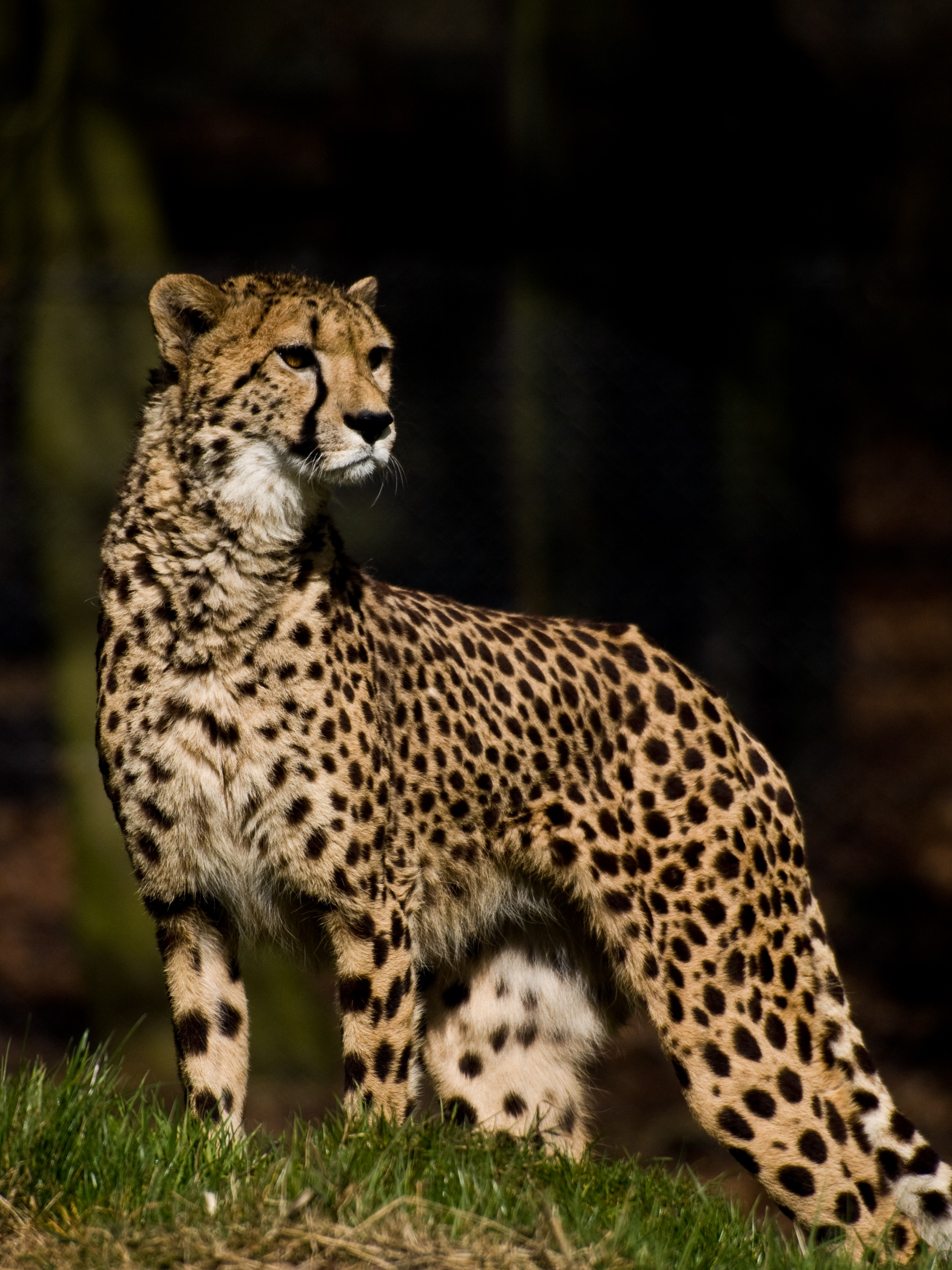
Cheetah

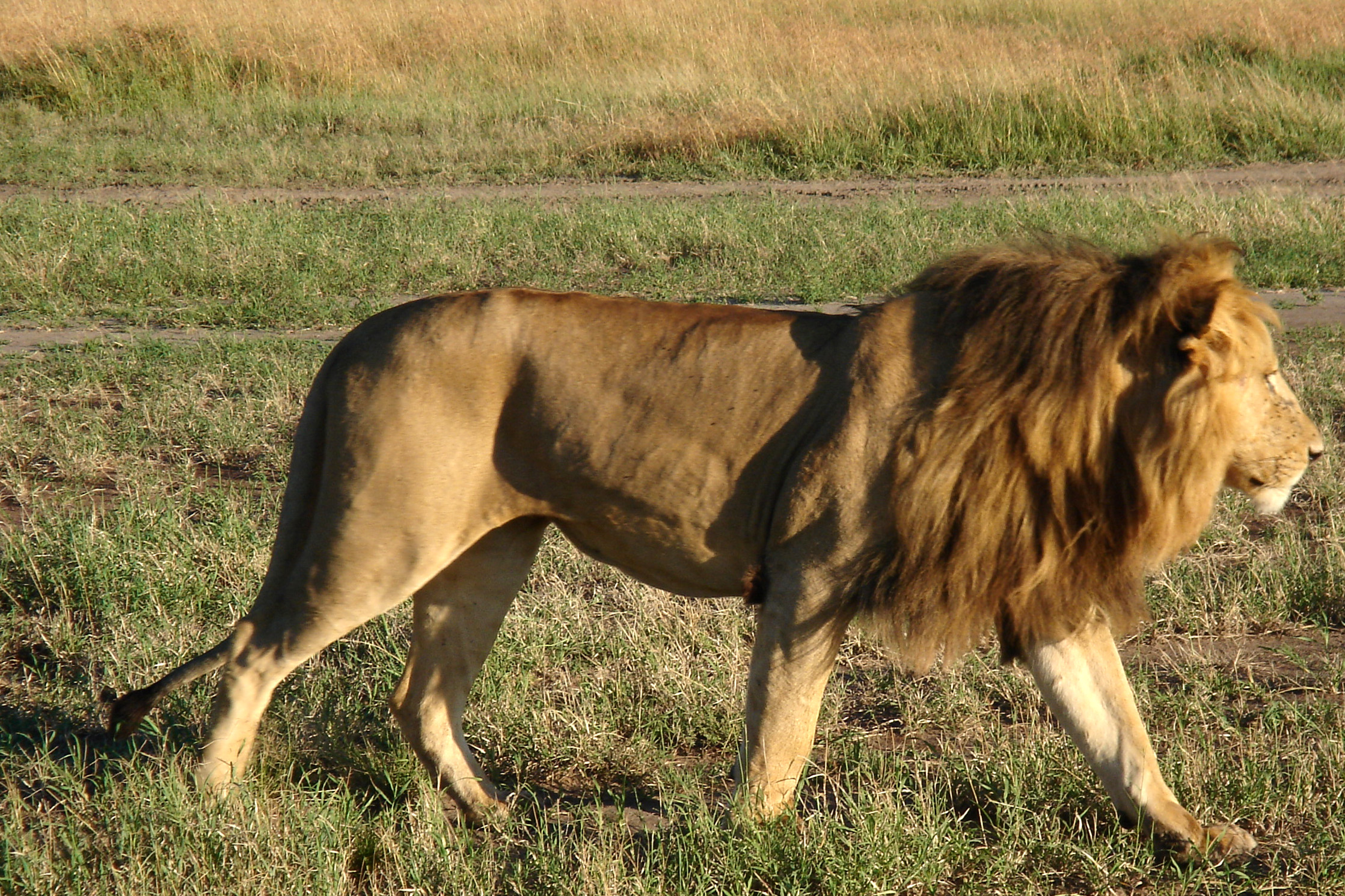
Lion

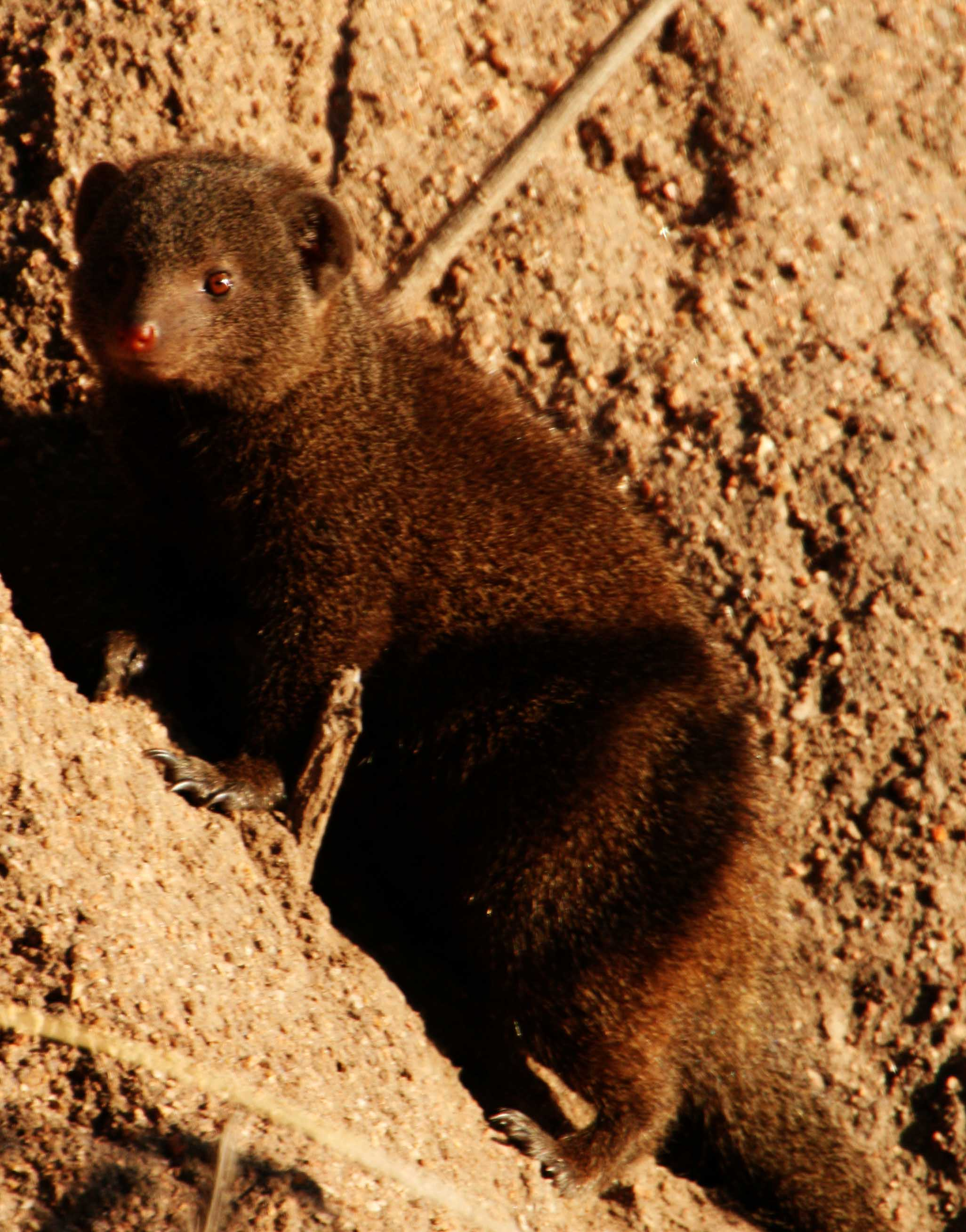
Common dwarf mongoose

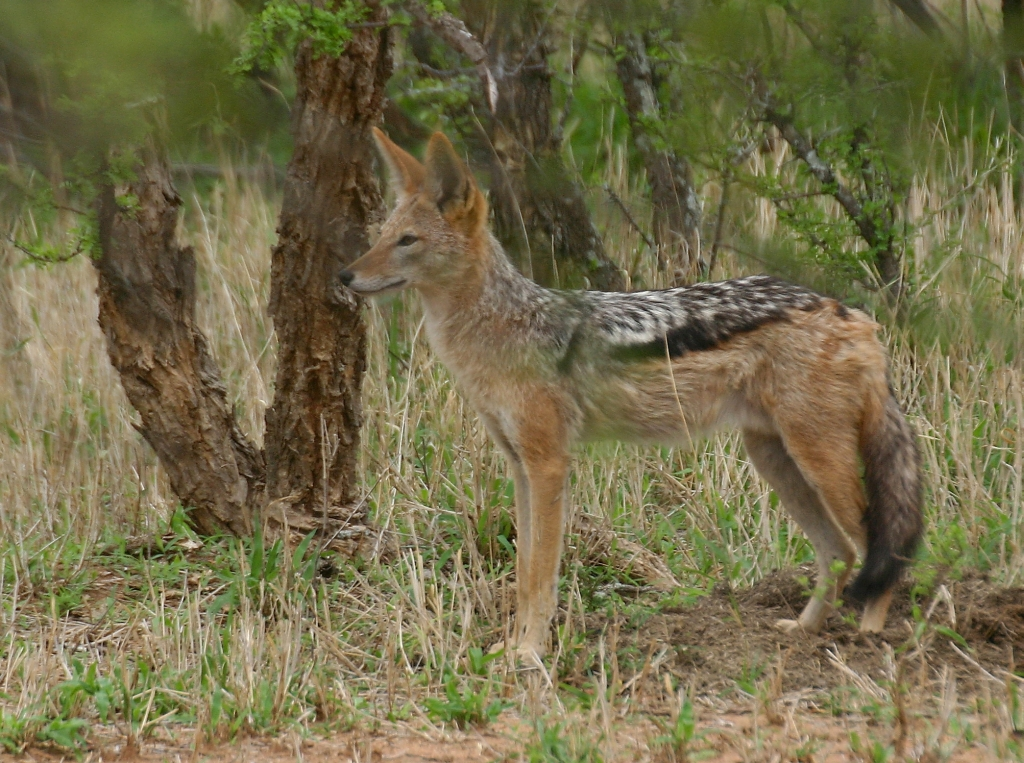
Black-backed jackal

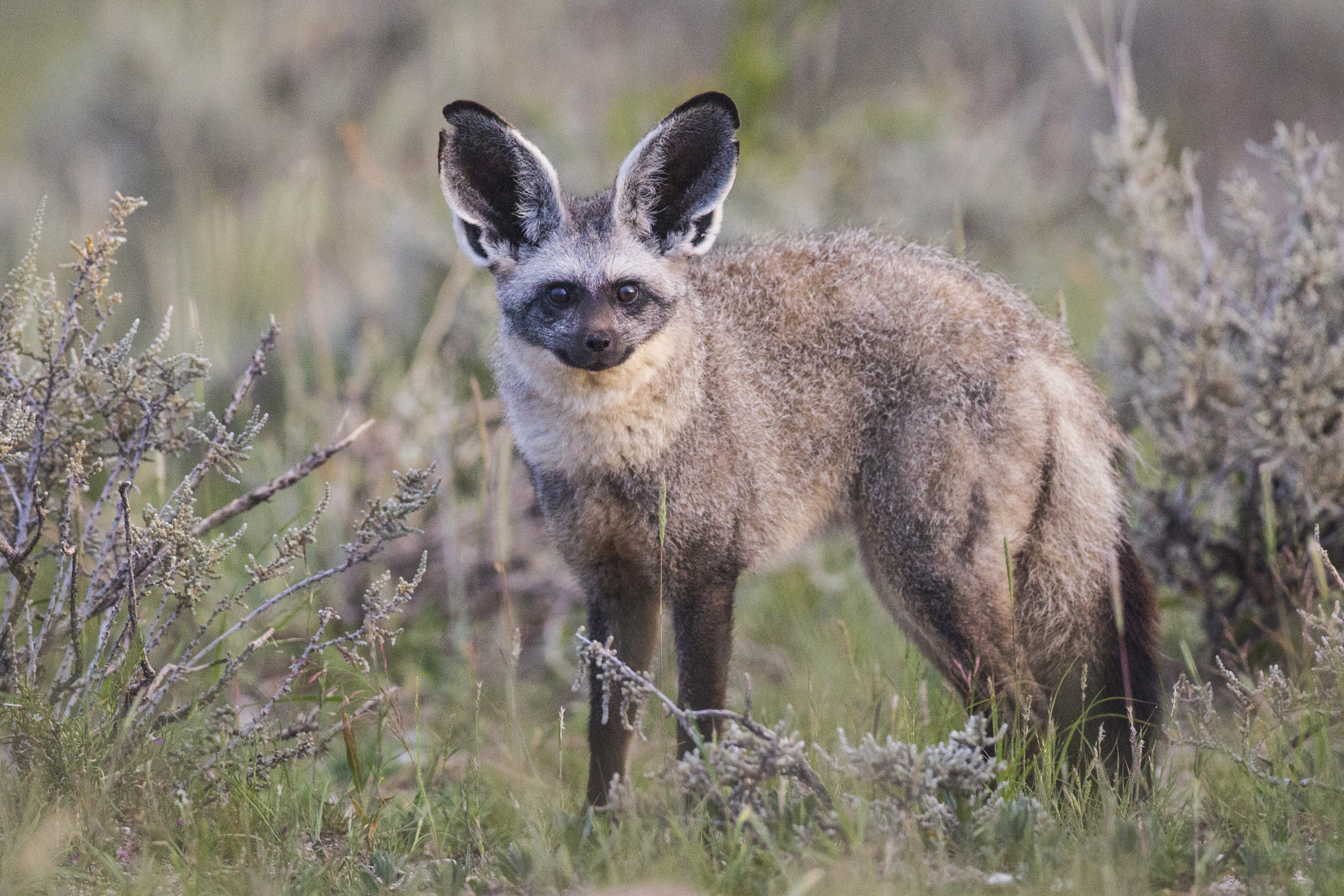
Bat-eared fox

There are over 260 species of carnivorans, the majority of which feed primarily on meat. They have a characteristic skull shape and dentition.

- Suborder: Feliformia
  - Family: Felidae
    - Subfamily: Felinae
      - Genus: Acinonyx
        - Cheetah, Acinonyx jubatus VU
      - Genus: Caracal
        - Caracal, Caracal caracal LC
      - Genus: Felis
        - African wildcat, Felis lybica LC
      - Genus: Leptailurus
        - Serval, Leptailurus serval LC
    - Subfamily: Pantherinae
      - Genus: Panthera
        - Lion, Panthera leo VU
        - Leopard, Panthera pardus VU
  - Family: Viverridae
    - Subfamily: Viverrinae
      - Genus: Civettictis
        - African civet, Civettictis civetta LC
      - Genus: Genetta
        - Abyssinian genet, Genetta abyssinica DD
        - Common genet, Genetta genetta LC
  - Family: Herpestidae (mongooses)
    - Genus: Atilax
      - Marsh mongoose, Atilax paludinosus LC
    - Genus: Galerella
      - Slender mongoose, Galerella sanguinea LC
    - Genus: Helogale
      - Ethiopian dwarf mongoose, Helogale hirtula LC
      - Common dwarf mongoose, Helogale parvula LC
    - Genus: Ichneumia
      - White-tailed mongoose, Ichneumia albicauda LC
    - Genus: Mungos
      - Banded mongoose, Mungos mungo LC
  - Family: Hyaenidae (hyaenas)
    - Genus: Crocuta
      - Spotted hyena, Crocuta crocuta LC
    - Genus: Hyaena
      - Striped hyena, Hyaena hyaena NT
    - Genus: Proteles
      - Aardwolf, Proteles cristatus LC
- Suborder: Caniformia
  - Family: Canidae (dogs, foxes)
    - Genus: Vulpes
      - Rüppell's fox, Vulpes rueppelli
    - Genus: Canis
      - Side-striped jackal, Canis adustus LC
      - African golden wolf, Canis anthus NE
      - Black-backed jackal, Canis mesomelas LC
    - Genus: Otocyon
      - Bat-eared fox, Otocyon megalotis LC
    - Genus: Lycaon
      - African wild dog, Lycaon pictus EN
  - Family: Mustelidae (mustelids)
    - Genus: Ictonyx
      - Striped polecat, Ictonyx striatus LC
    - Genus: Mellivora
      - Honey badger, M. capensis LC

== Order: Perissodactyla (odd-toed ungulates) ==
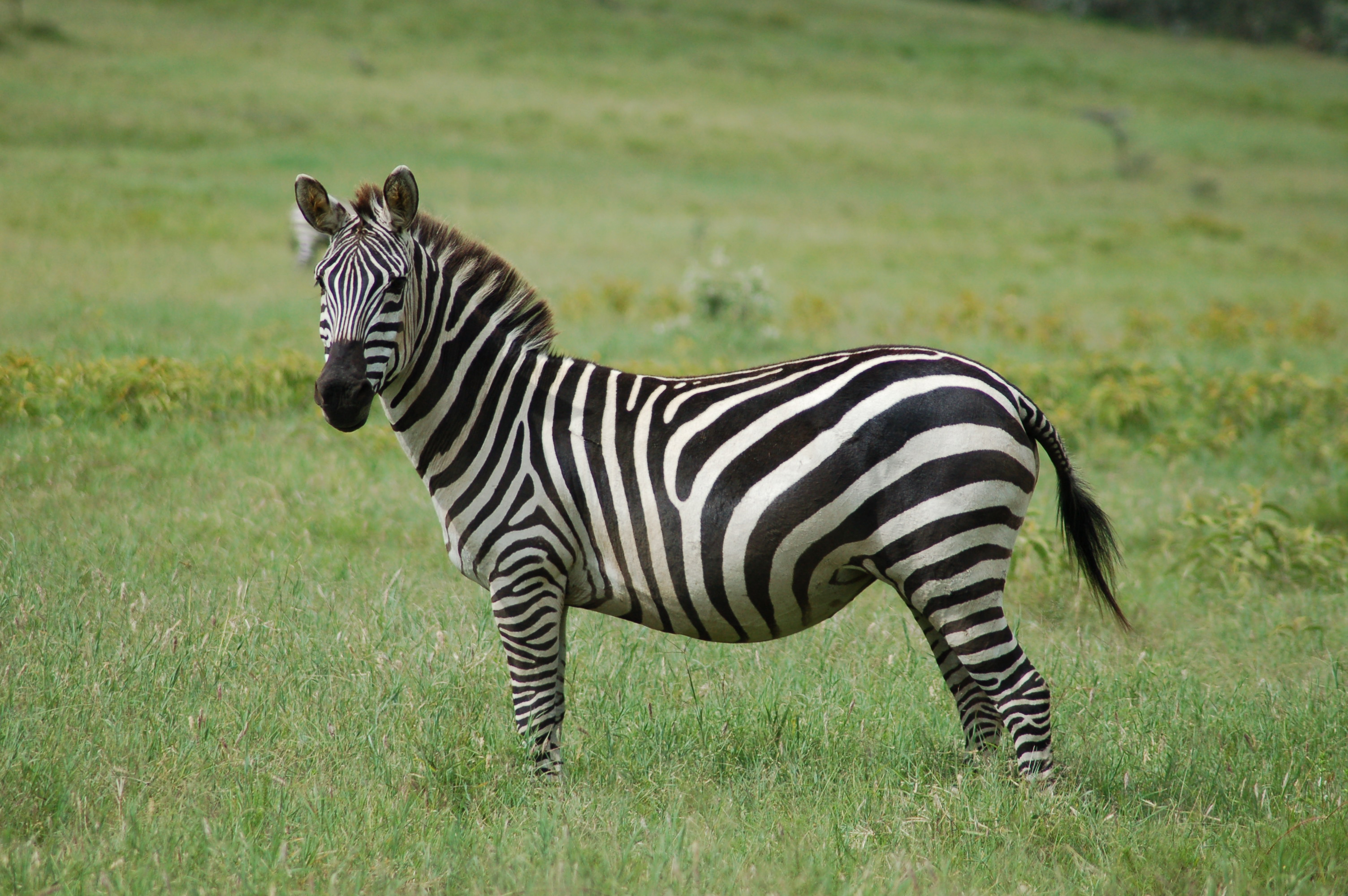
Grant's zebra

The odd-toed ungulates are browsing and grazing mammals. They are usually large to very large, and have relatively simple stomachs and a large middle toe.

- Family: Equidae (horses etc.)
  - Genus: Equus
    - Somali wild ass, Equus africanus somaliensis CR
    - Grant's zebra, Equus quagga boehmi NT

== Order: Artiodactyla (even-toed ungulates) ==
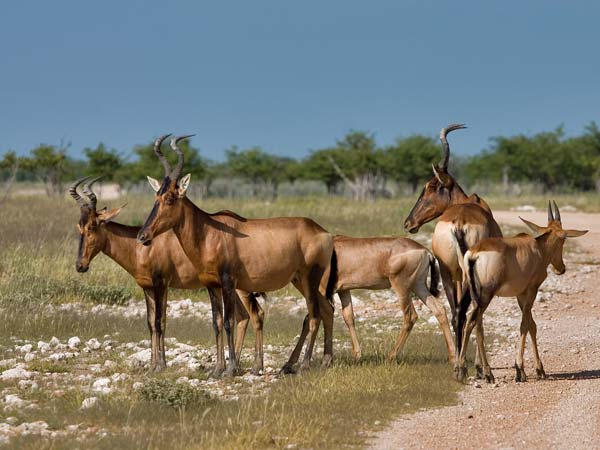
Hartebeest

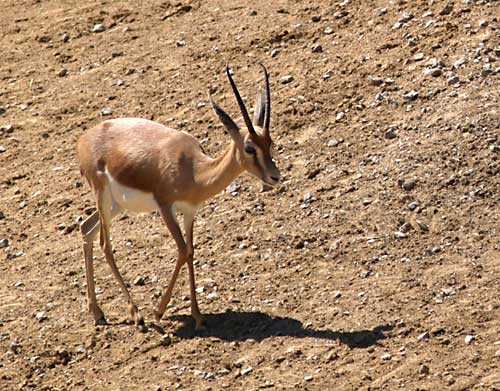
Dorcas gazelle

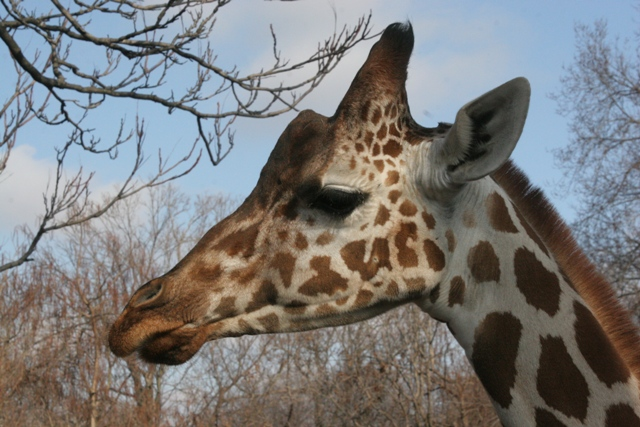
Somali giraffe

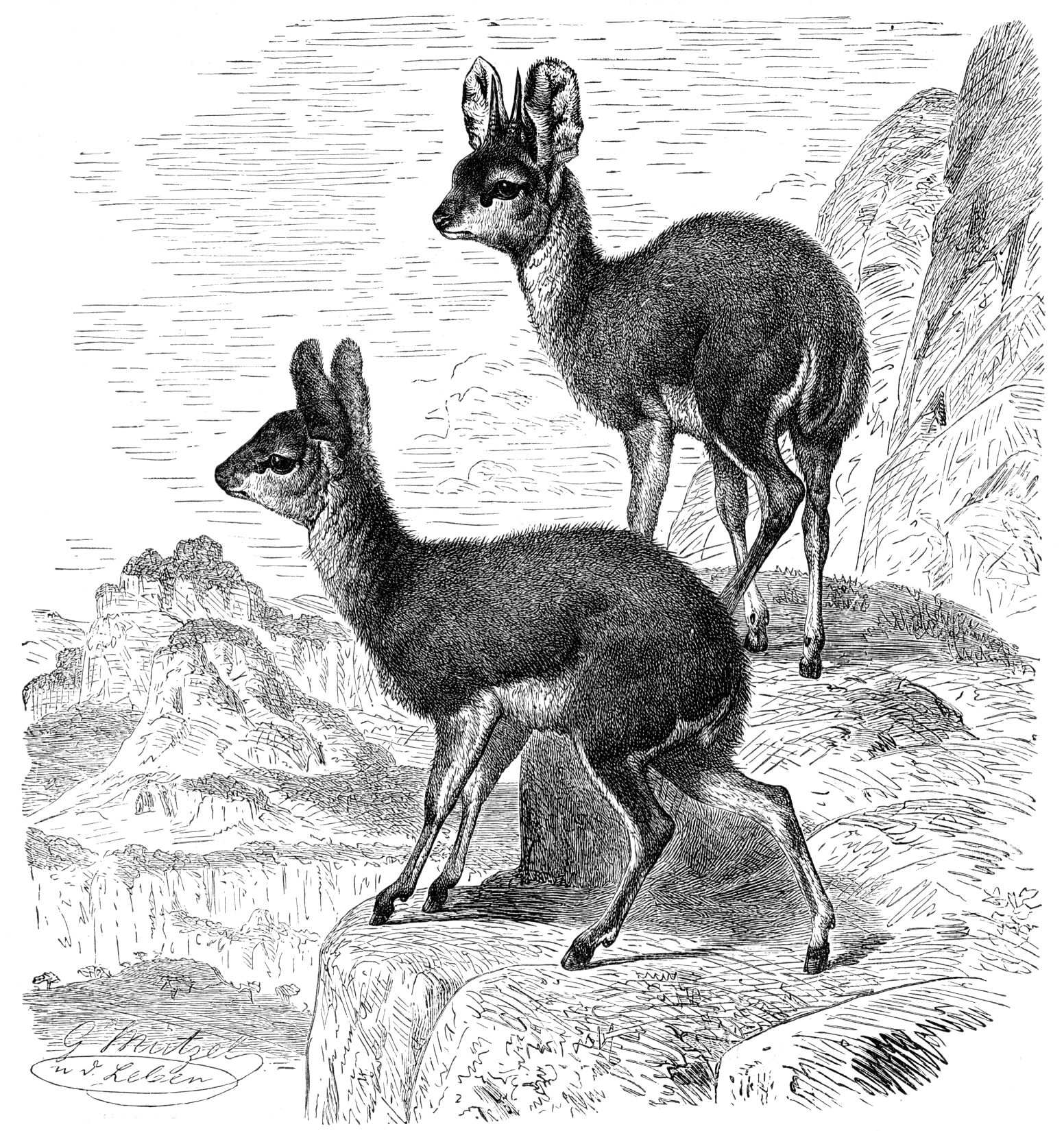
Klipspringer

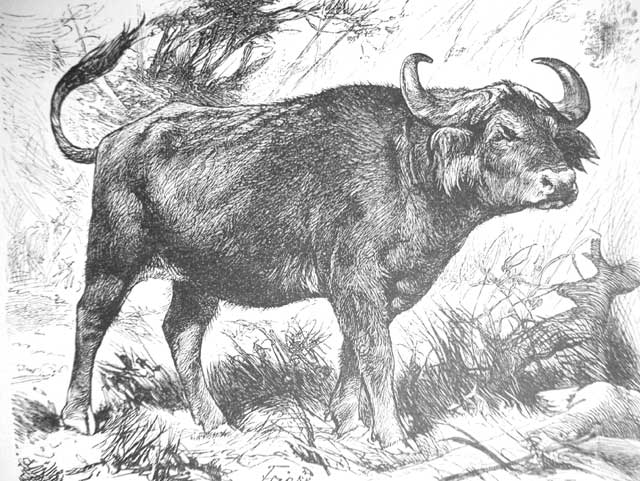
African buffalo

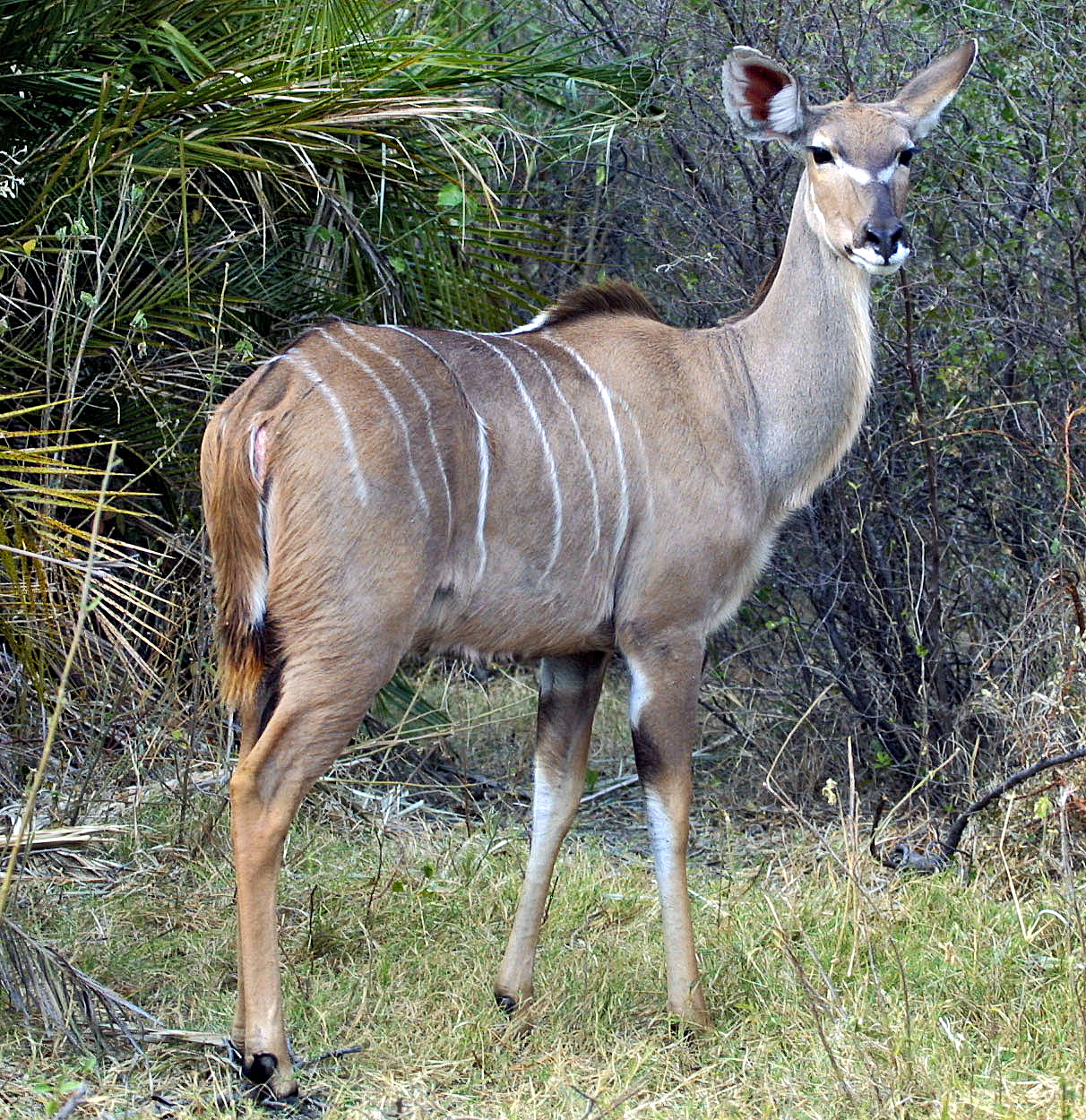
Greater kudu

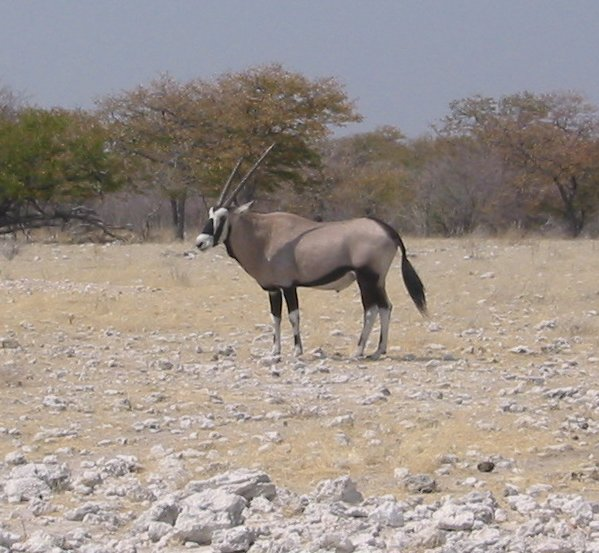
Gemsbok

The even-toed ungulates are ungulates whose weight is borne about equally by the third and fourth toes, rather than mostly or entirely by the third as in perissodactyls. There are about 220 artiodactyl species, including many that are of great economic importance to humans.

- Family: Suidae (pigs)
  - Subfamily: Phacochoerinae
    - Genus: Phacochoerus
      - Desert warthog, Phacochoerus aethiopicus LR/lc
      - Common warthog, Phacochoerus africanus LR/lc
  - Subfamily: Suinae
    - Genus: Potamochoerus
      - Bushpig, Potamochoerus larvatus LR/lc
- Family: Hippopotamidae (hippopotamuses)
  - Genus: Hippopotamus
    - Hippopotamus, Hippopotamus amphibius VU
- Family: Giraffidae (giraffe, okapi)
  - Genus: Giraffa
    - Reticulated giraffe, Giraffa reticulata VU
- Family: Bovidae (cattle, antelope, sheep, goats)
    - Genus: Damaliscus
      - Topi, Damaliscus lunatus LR/cd
    - Genus: Beatragus
      - Hirola, Beatragus hunteri CR
  - Subfamily: Antilopinae
    - Genus: Ammodorcas
      - Dibatag, Ammodorcas clarkei VU
    - Genus: Dorcatragus
      - Beira, Dorcatragus megalotis VU
    - Genus: Gazella
      - Dorcas gazelle, Gazella dorcas VU
      - Grant's gazelle, Gazella granti LR/cd
      - Soemmerring's gazelle, Gazella soemmerringii VU
      - Speke's gazelle, Gazella spekei VU
    - Genus: Litocranius
      - Gerenuk, Litocranius walleri LR/cd
    - Genus: Madoqua
      - Kirk's dik-dik, Madoqua kirkii LR/lc
      - Silver dik-dik, Madoqua piacentinii VU
      - Salt's dik-dik, Madoqua saltiana LR/lc
    - Genus: Oreotragus
      - Klipspringer, Oreotragus oreotragus LR/cd
    - Genus: Ourebia
      - Oribi, Ourebia ourebi LR/cd
  - Subfamily: Bovinae
    - Genus: Syncerus
      - African buffalo, Syncerus caffer LR/cd
    - Genus: Tragelaphus
      - Lesser kudu, Tragelaphus imberbis LR/cd
      - Bushbuck, Tragelaphus scriptus LR/lc
      - Greater kudu, Tragelaphus strepsiceros LR/cd
  - Subfamily: Cephalophinae
    - Genus: Cephalophus
      - Harvey's duiker, Cephalophus harveyi LR/cd
    - Genus: Sylvicapra
      - Common duiker, Sylvicapra grimmia LR/lc
  - Subfamily: Hippotraginae
    - Genus: Oryx
      - East African oryx, Oryx beisa LR/cd
  - Subfamily: Reduncinae
    - Genus: Kobus
      - Waterbuck, Kobus ellipsiprymnus LR/cd
- Family: Camelidae
  - Genus: Camelus
    - Dromedary, Camelus dromedarius LC

== See also ==
- Wildlife of Somaliland
- List of chordate orders
- Lists of mammals by region
- List of prehistoric mammals
- Mammal classification
- List of mammals described in the 2000s
