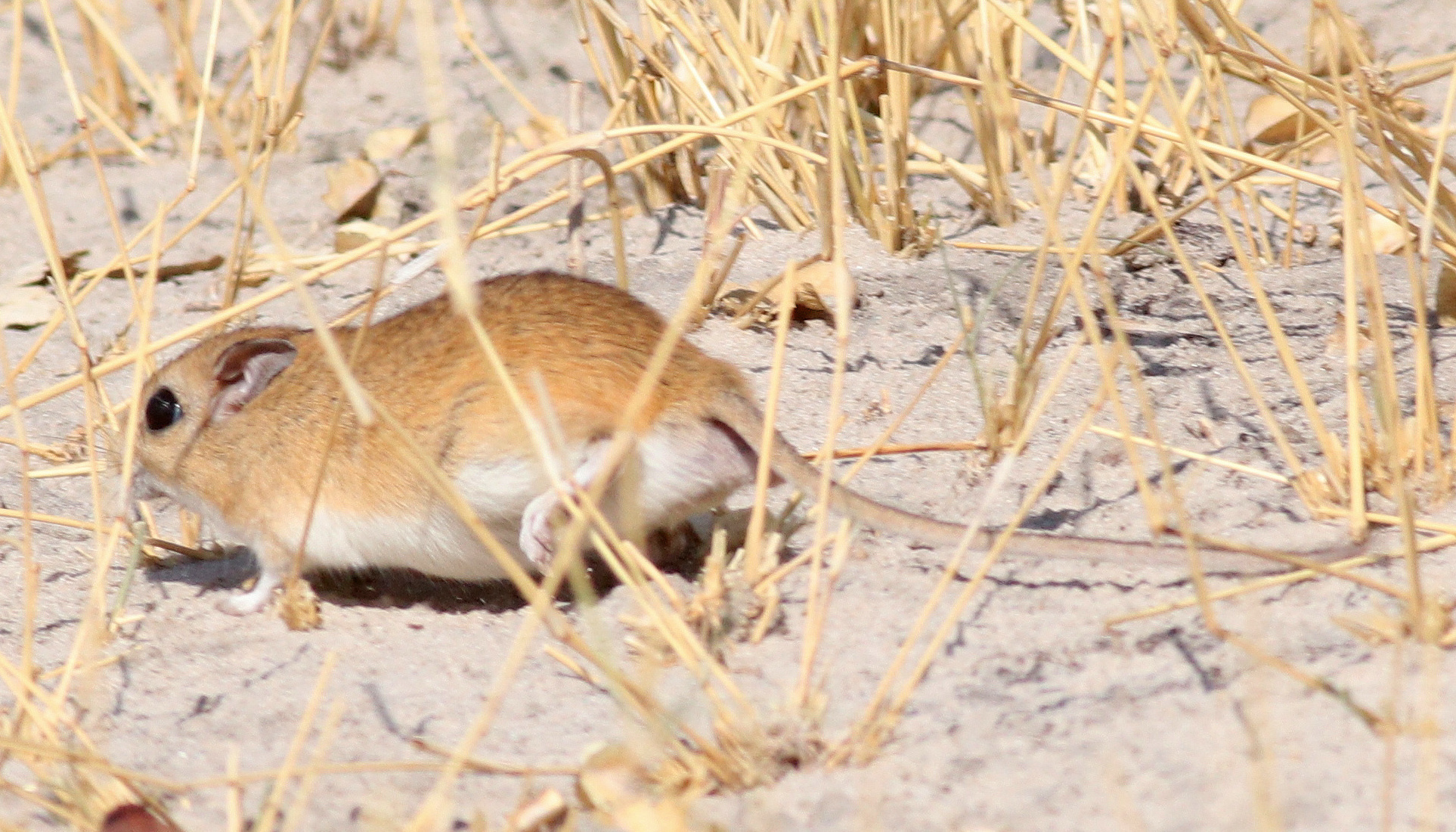

Conservation status
- Least Concern (IUCN 3.1)

Scientific classification
- Kingdom: Animalia
- Phylum: Chordata
- Class: Mammalia
- Order: Rodentia
- Family: Muridae
- Genus: Gerbilliscus
- Species: G. leucogaster

Binomial name
- Gerbilliscus leucogaster (Peters, 1852)

= Bushveld gerbil =

Species of rodent

The bushveld gerbil (Gerbilliscus leucogaster) is a species of rodent found in Angola, Botswana, Democratic Republic of the Congo, Kenya, Malawi, Mozambique, Namibia, South Africa, Eswatini, Tanzania, Uganda, Zambia, and Zimbabwe. Its natural habitats are dry savanna, subtropical or tropical dry shrubland, subtropical or tropical dry lowland grassland, and hot deserts. Older sources classify it in the genus Tatera.

The bushveld gerbil is classified as a granivorous insectivore, but it will feed on herbage if its preferred foods are unavailable, and it commonly does so in the dry season. Breeding occurs in the wet season (September to April), with its timing dependent on the amount of rainfall. Mean litter size is between four and five.
