= Guinean gerbil =

Conservation status
- Least Concern (IUCN 3.1)

Scientific classification
- Kingdom: Animalia
- Phylum: Chordata
- Class: Mammalia
- Order: Rodentia
- Family: Muridae
- Genus: Gerbilliscus
- Species: G. guineae

Binomial name
- Gerbilliscus guineae (Thomas, 1910)

Species of rodent

The Guinean gerbil (Gerbilliscus guineae) is a species of rodent found in Burkina Faso, Gambia, Ghana, Guinea, Guinea-Bissau, Ivory Coast, Mali, Senegal, Sierra Leone, and possibly Liberia. Its natural habitats are subtropical or tropical dry forests, dry savanna, rocky areas and arable land, but it is mostly found in areas laterite or clay soils, and with variable amounts of vegetation and dense scrub. This species is described as common and has a stable population and a wide distribution, so the International Union for Conservation of Nature has rated its conservation status as being of "least concern".

== Description ==
The Guinean gerbil is a fairly large gerbil growing to a head-and-body length of about 150 mm (6 in) with a tail of about 175 mm (7 in). The head has a slightly-rounded snout, large eyes and somewhat elongated ears. The upper parts of the body are greyish-brown, the individual hairs having dark grey bases, orange or brown shafts and black tips. The head and flanks are paler, the hairs lacking dark tips. The underparts, including the chin, throat, the inside of the limbs, the fore-feet and the upper side of the hind-feet are white. There is a clear division between the dorsal and ventral colouring. The tail is well-haired and bicoloured, being dark above and pale beneath, with a tuft of long dark hairs at the tip.

== Ecology ==
The Guinean gerbil is nocturnal. It excavates a fairly complex burrow system that goes as deep as 50 cm (2 ft). The average size of the home range of the Guinean gerbil is 1,450 square metres (15,600 sq ft). Little is known about the animal's diet. In western Senegal, breeding takes place in the wet season and continues into the dry season. Litter sizes average four or five.
