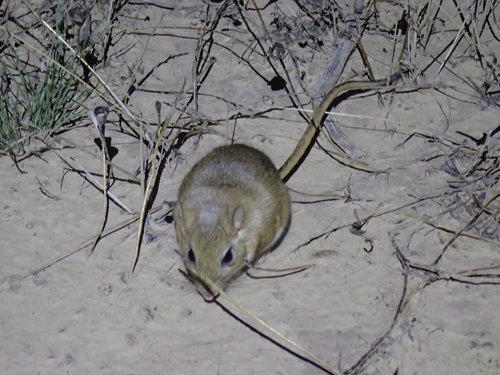

Conservation status
- Least Concern (IUCN 3.1)

Scientific classification
- Kingdom: Animalia
- Phylum: Chordata
- Class: Mammalia
- Order: Rodentia
- Family: Muridae
- Genus: Gerbilliscus
- Species: G. afer

Binomial name
- Gerbilliscus afer (Gray, 1830)

= Cape gerbil =

Species of rodent

The Cape gerbil (Gerbilliscus afer) is a species of rodent found only in South Africa. Its natural habitats are subtropical or tropical dry shrubland and temperate desert.
