= Savanna gerbil =

Conservation status
- Least Concern (IUCN 3.1)

Scientific classification
- Kingdom: Animalia
- Phylum: Chordata
- Class: Mammalia
- Order: Rodentia
- Family: Muridae
- Genus: Gerbilliscus
- Species: G. validus

Binomial name
- Gerbilliscus validus (Bocage, 1890)

Species of rodent

The savanna gerbil (Gerbilliscus validus) is a species of rodent found in Angola, Burundi, Democratic Republic of the Congo, Ethiopia, Kenya, Mali, Rwanda, Sudan, Tanzania, Uganda, Zambia, and Zimbabwe. Its natural habitats are dry savanna, moist savanna, and arable land.
