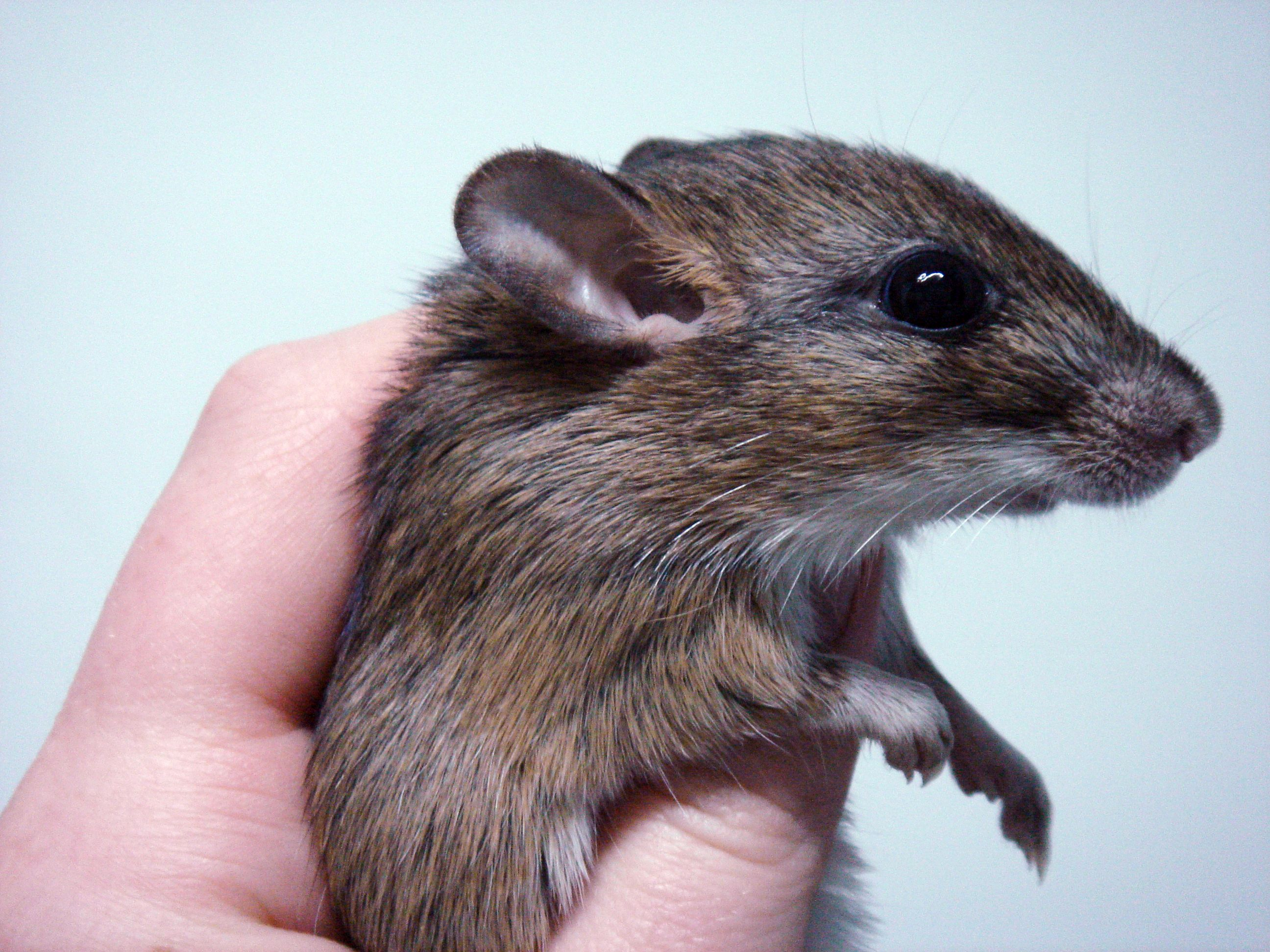
- Kemp's gerbil (Gerbilliscus kempi)

Scientific classification
- Domain: Eukaryota
- Kingdom: Animalia
- Phylum: Chordata
- Class: Mammalia
- Order: Rodentia
- Family: Muridae
- Tribe: Gerbillurini
- Genus: Gerbilliscus; Thomas, 1897

Type species
- Gerbillus boehmi

Species
- Gerbilliscus afra Gerbilliscus boehmi Gerbilliscus brantsii Gerbilliscus guineae Gerbilliscus inclusus Gerbilliscus kempi Gerbilliscus leucogaster Gerbilliscus nigricaudus Gerbilliscus phillipsi Gerbilliscus robustus Gerbilliscus validus

= Gerbilliscus =

Genus of rodents

Gerbilliscus is a genus of rodent in the subfamily Gerbillinae (gerbils) of the family Muridae. It contains the following species, all native to Africa:

- Cape gerbil (Gerbilliscus afra)
- Boehm's gerbil (Gerbilliscus boehmi)
- Highveld gerbil (Gerbilliscus brantsii)
- Guinean gerbil (Gerbilliscus guineae)
- Gorongoza gerbil (Gerbilliscus inclusus)
- Kemp's gerbil (Gerbilliscus kempi)
- Bushveld gerbil (Gerbilliscus leucogaster)
- Black-tailed gerbil (Gerbilliscus nigricaudus)
- Phillips's gerbil (Gerbilliscus phillipsi)
- Fringe-tailed gerbil (Gerbilliscus robustus)
- Savanna gerbil (Gerbilliscus validus)

Species currently classified in this genus were formerly treated in the genus Tatera.
