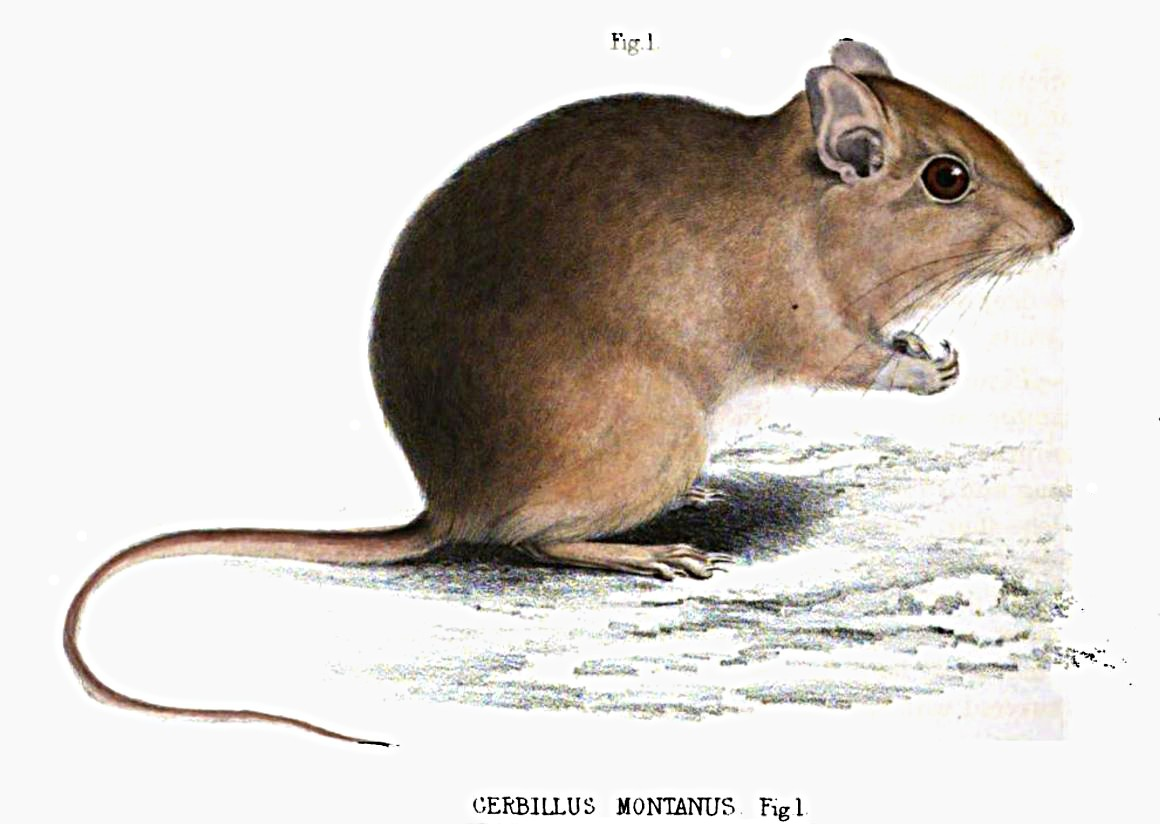

Conservation status
- Least Concern (IUCN 3.1)

Scientific classification
- Kingdom: Animalia
- Phylum: Chordata
- Class: Mammalia
- Order: Rodentia
- Family: Muridae
- Genus: Gerbilliscus
- Species: G. brantsii

Binomial name
- Gerbilliscus brantsii (Smith, 1836)

= Highveld gerbil =

Species of rodent

The highveld gerbil (Gerbilliscus brantsii) is a species of rodent found in Angola, Botswana, Lesotho, Namibia, South Africa, Eswatini, Zambia, and Zimbabwe. Its natural habitats are dry savanna, temperate shrubland, subtropical or tropical dry shrubland, temperate grassland, and temperate desert. This is a common species with a wide range and the International Union for Conservation of Nature has rated it as being of "least concern" as of 2008.

== Description ==
The highveld gerbil is a medium-sized species with soft, fluffy fur, the individual hairs having chevron patterns. It grows to a head-and-body length of about 135 mm (5.3 in). The head is narrow, with long whiskers and a pointed snout. The eyes are large, the chin white and the ears long, with rounded tips. The upper parts are pale rufous-brown, washed with brown. The underparts are whitish or pale buffy-grey. The hind legs are much longer than the forelegs. The tail is long, being about the same length as the head and body. The proximal half of the tail is the same colour as the animal's upper parts, and the distal half is white.

== Distribution and habitat ==
The highveld gerbil is native to southern Africa. Its range includes Angola, Botswana, Lesotho, Mozambique, Namibia, South Africa, Eswatini, Zambia and Zimbabwe. Its typical habitat is grassy plains with scrub or open woodland on sandy soils, and it also occurs around marshes and pans on peaty soils.

== Ecology ==
The highveld gerbil is sociable, with several individuals living in close proximity to each other. It digs a complex burrow in loose, sandy soil which may extend for 6 m (20 ft). There are several entrances and a single nesting chamber. The animal is nocturnal, and chiefly active around dusk and dawn. Its diet consists of plant material, including the green parts and roots, and a small proportion of insects. Females may have five or six litters per year. The gestation period is about three weeks and the litter size averages three young.
