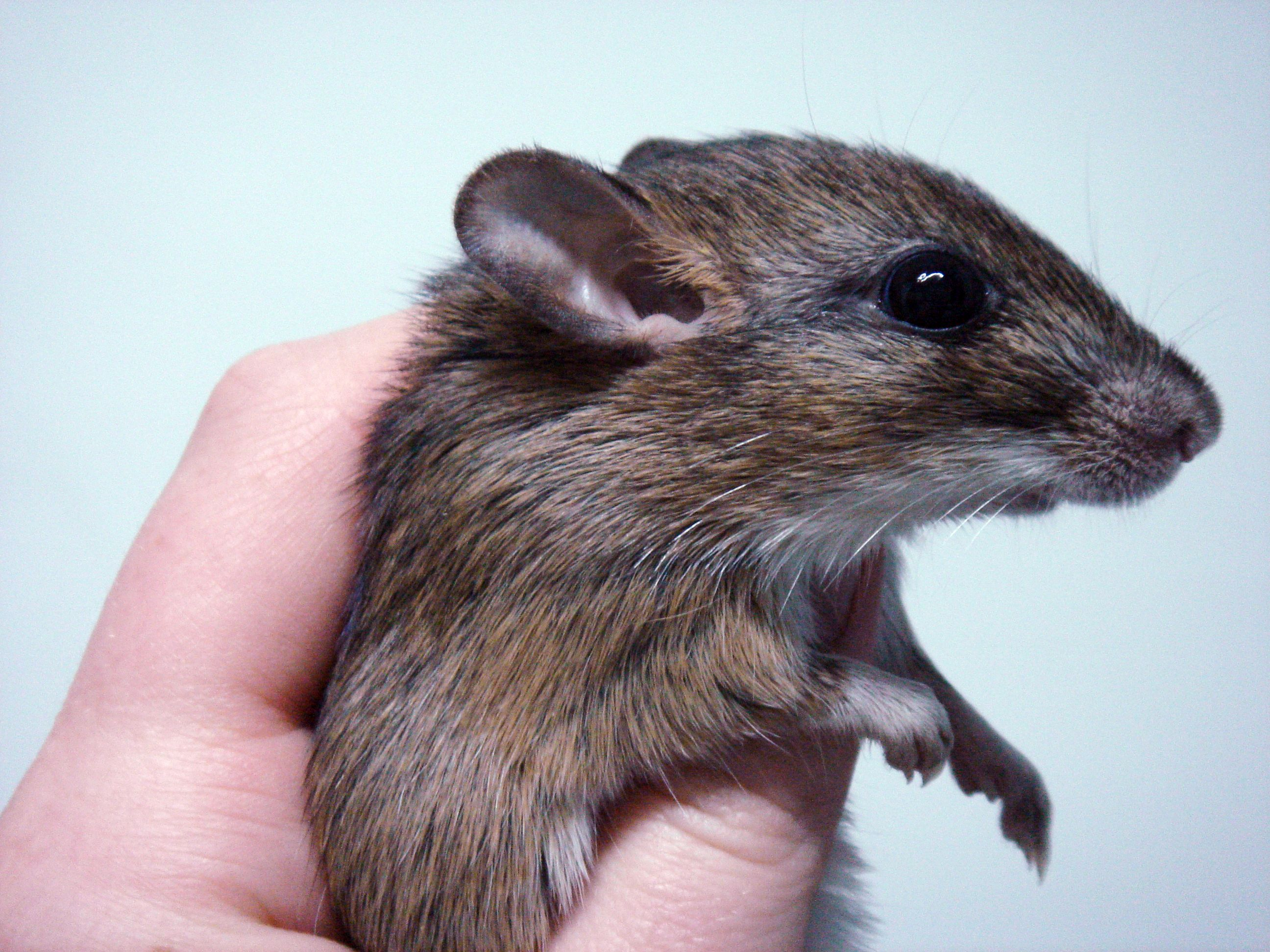

Conservation status
- Least Concern (IUCN 3.1)

Scientific classification
- Kingdom: Animalia
- Phylum: Chordata
- Class: Mammalia
- Order: Rodentia
- Family: Muridae
- Genus: Gerbilliscus
- Species: G. kempi

Binomial name
- Gerbilliscus kempi (Wroughton, 1906)

Synonyms
- Gerbilliscus gambiana (Thomas, 1910)

= Kemp's gerbil =

Species of rodent

Kemp's gerbil (Gerbilliscus kempi) is a species of rodent. Mammal Species of the World considers G. kempi and G. gambianus to be synonyms, however the IUCN has assessed each taxon as were they different species.

According to the IUCN in 2004, what they call G. kempi was found in Benin, Burkina Faso, Burundi, Cameroon, Central African Republic, Chad, Democratic Republic of the Congo, Ivory Coast, Ethiopia, Ghana, Guinea, Kenya, Mali, Nigeria, Rwanda, Sierra Leone, Sudan, Togo, Uganda, and possibly Liberia.
