= Gorongoza gerbil =

Conservation status
- Least Concern (IUCN 3.1)

Scientific classification
- Kingdom: Animalia
- Phylum: Chordata
- Class: Mammalia
- Order: Rodentia
- Family: Muridae
- Genus: Gerbilliscus
- Species: G. inclusus

Binomial name
- Gerbilliscus inclusus (Thomas & Wroughton, 1908)

Species of mammal

The Gorongoza gerbil (Gerbilliscus inclusus) is a species of rodent found in Mozambique, Tanzania, and Zimbabwe. Its natural habitat is moist savanna.
