= Boehm's gerbil =

Conservation status
- Least Concern (IUCN 3.1)

Scientific classification
- Kingdom: Animalia
- Phylum: Chordata
- Class: Mammalia
- Order: Rodentia
- Family: Muridae
- Genus: Gerbilliscus
- Species: G. boehmi

Binomial name
- Gerbilliscus boehmi (Noack, 1887)

Synonyms
- Tatera boehmi

Species of rodent

Boehm's gerbil (Gerbilliscus boehmi) is a species of rodent found in Angola, Burundi, Democratic Republic of the Congo, Kenya, Malawi, Mozambique, Rwanda, Tanzania, Uganda, and Zambia. Its natural habitats are dry savanna, moist savanna, and arable land. This is a common species with a wide distribution which faces no obvious threats, so in 2004 the International Union for Conservation of Nature rated its conservation status as being of "least concern".

== Description ==
Boehm's gerbil is a large member of the genus with a very long tail; head-and-body length averages 162 mm (6.4 in) and tail 216 mm (8.5 in). The forehead and muzzle are dark brown to black, the eyes large and the ears large, rounded and clad in black hairs. The upper parts of head and body are mid brown, speckled with black and buff. The midback is darker as the hairs are tipped with black; the flanks are paler because the hairs here are tipped with ochre. The chin, underparts and insides of the limbs are white. The cheeks and shoulders often have the hairs tipped with cinnamon, and there is a sharp dividing line between the colouring of the upper parts and the lower parts. The tail is slender, the upper side being dark and the lower side white, apart from the terminal portion which is white all round, often with a small tuft of white hairs at the tip.

== Ecology ==
Boehm's gerbil lives in a burrow with one or two entrances which it either digs itself or uses a pre-existing burrow of another gerbil species or a mole-rat. It is omnivorous, emerging at night to forage for vegetable material and insects, possibly over a large area. Breeding takes place at different times of year in different parts of its range, often coinciding with the rainy season.
