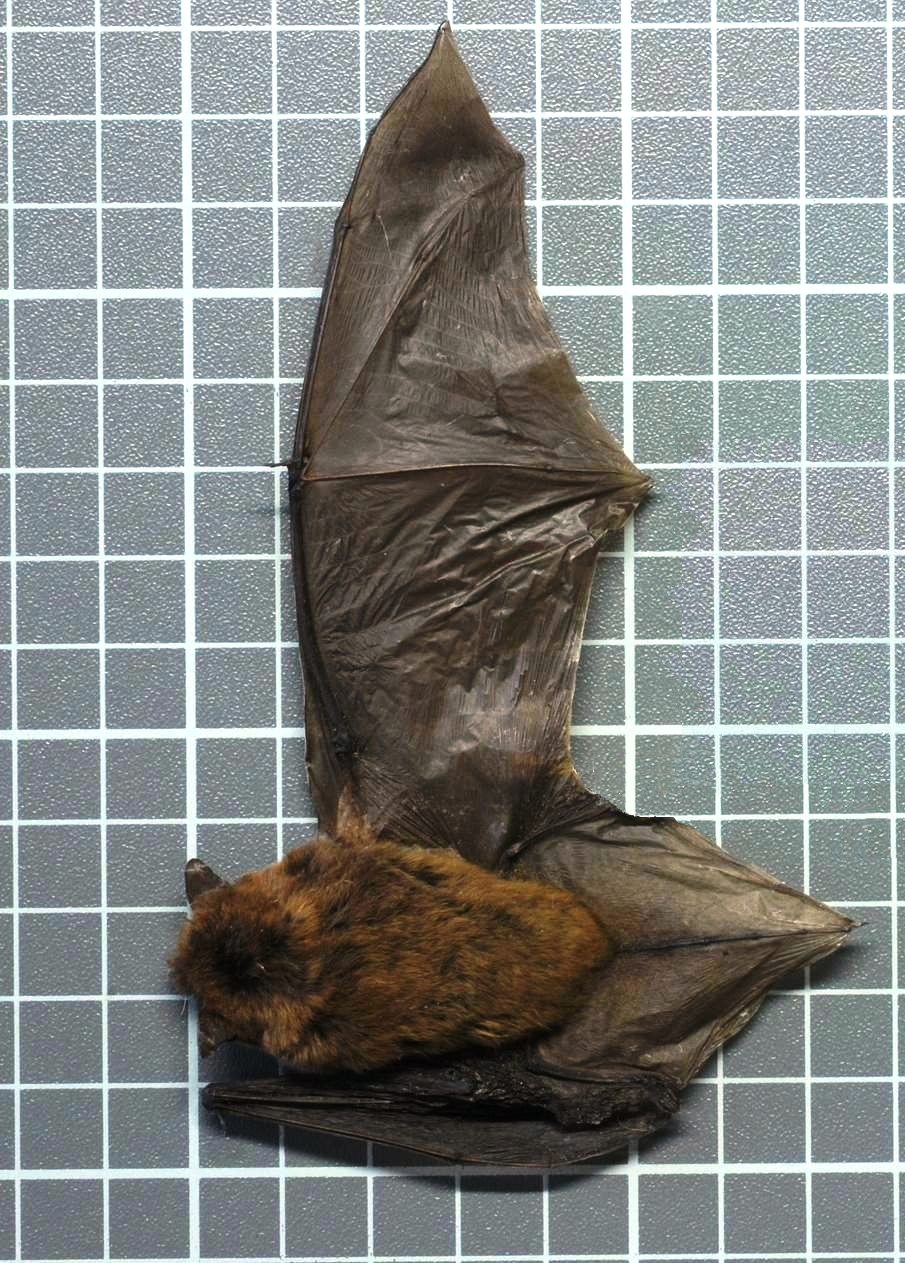
- Banana serotine (A. nanus)

Scientific classification
- Kingdom: Animalia
- Phylum: Chordata
- Class: Mammalia
- Order: Chiroptera
- Family: Vespertilionidae
- Tribe: Vespertilionini
- Genus: Afronycteris; Monadjem et al., 2020

Species
- A. helios A. nanus

= Afronycteris =

Genus of bats

Afronycteris is a genus of vesper bat containing two species, both of which are found in sub-Saharan Africa. Its members were previously classified in Neoromicia before phylogenetic analysis found them to comprise a separate genus.

== Spedcies ==
There are currently three described species in this genus:

- Heller's serotine, Afronycteris helios
- Banana serotine, Afronycteris nanus
- Afronycteris rautenbachi
