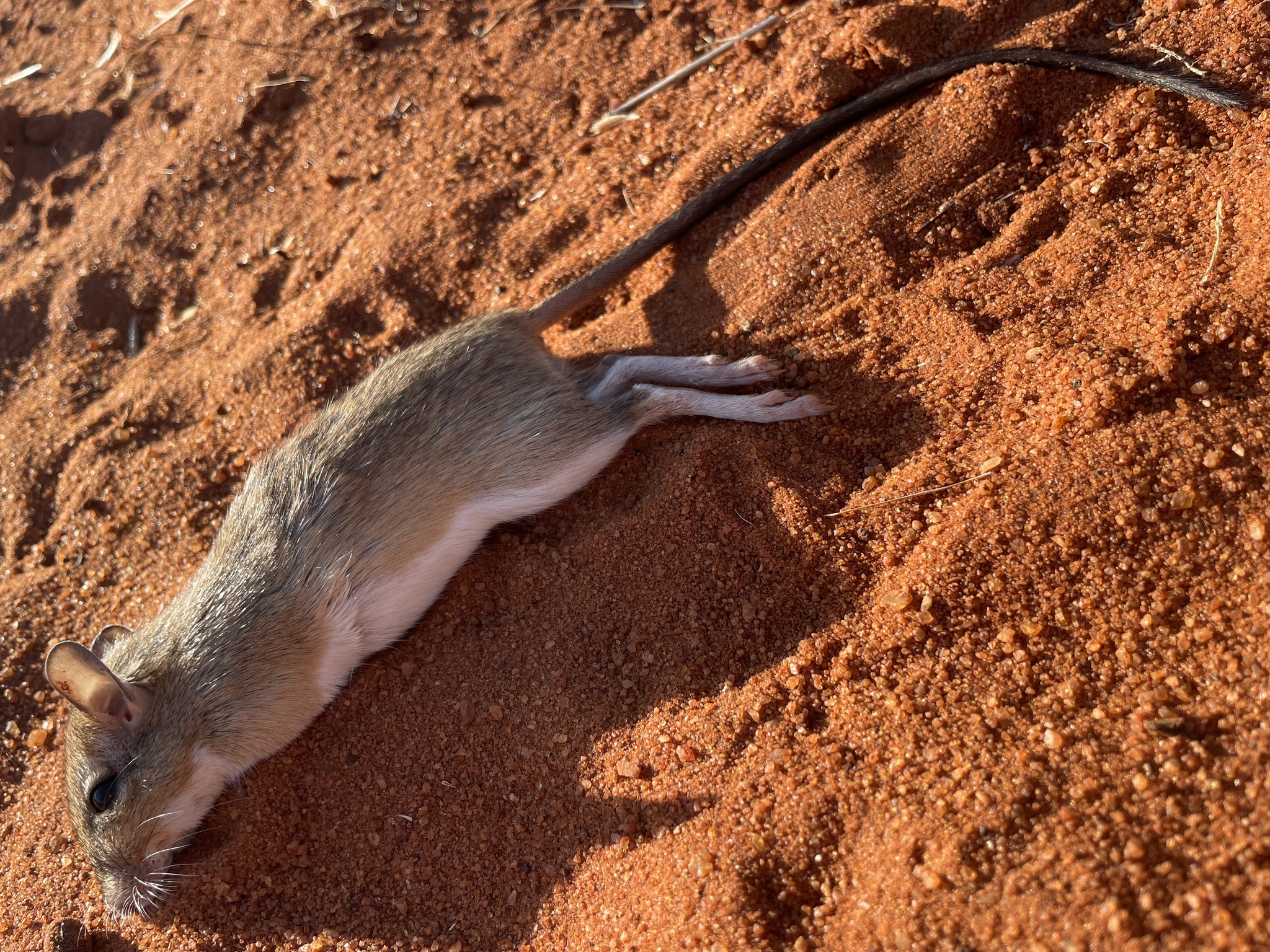

Conservation status
- Least Concern (IUCN 3.1)

Scientific classification
- Kingdom: Animalia
- Phylum: Chordata
- Class: Mammalia
- Order: Rodentia
- Family: Muridae
- Genus: Gerbilliscus
- Species: G. nigricaudus

Binomial name
- Gerbilliscus nigricaudus (Peters, 1878)

= Black-tailed gerbil =

Species of rodent

The black-tailed gerbil (Gerbilliscus nigricaudus) is a species of rodent found in Ethiopia, Kenya, Somalia, and Tanzania. Its natural habitats are dry savanna, subtropical or tropical dry shrubland, and arable land.
