= Fringe-tailed gerbil =

Conservation status
- Least Concern (IUCN 3.1)

Scientific classification
- Kingdom: Animalia
- Phylum: Chordata
- Class: Mammalia
- Order: Rodentia
- Family: Muridae
- Genus: Gerbilliscus
- Species: G. robustus

Binomial name
- Gerbilliscus robustus (Cretzschmar, 1826)

Species of rodent

The fringe-tailed gerbil (Gerbilliscus robustus) is a species of rodent found in Central African Republic, Chad, Eritrea, Ethiopia, Kenya, Niger, Somalia, Sudan, Tanzania, Uganda, possibly Cameroon, and possibly Nigeria. Its natural habitats are dry savanna, moist savanna, subtropical or tropical dry lowland grassland, arable land and urban areas.
