= Phillips's gerbil =

Conservation status
- Least Concern (IUCN 3.1)

Scientific classification
- Kingdom: Animalia
- Phylum: Chordata
- Class: Mammalia
- Order: Rodentia
- Family: Muridae
- Genus: Gerbilliscus
- Species: G. phillipsi

Binomial name
- Gerbilliscus phillipsi (de Winton, 1898)

Species of rodent

Phillips's gerbil (Gerbilliscus phillipsi) is a species of rodent found in Ethiopia, Kenya, and Somalia. Its natural habitat is subtropical or tropical dry shrubland.
