= Heller's serotine =

Conservation status
- Data Deficient (IUCN 3.1)

Scientific classification
- Kingdom: Animalia
- Phylum: Chordata
- Class: Mammalia
- Order: Chiroptera
- Family: Vespertilionidae
- Genus: Afronycteris
- Species: A. helios

Binomial name
- Afronycteris helios (Heller, 1912)

Synonyms
- Neoromicia helios Heller, 1912; Pipistrellus nanus helios Heller, 1912

Species of bat

Heller's serotine (Afronycteris helios), formerly known as Heller's pipistrelle, is a species of vesper bat.
