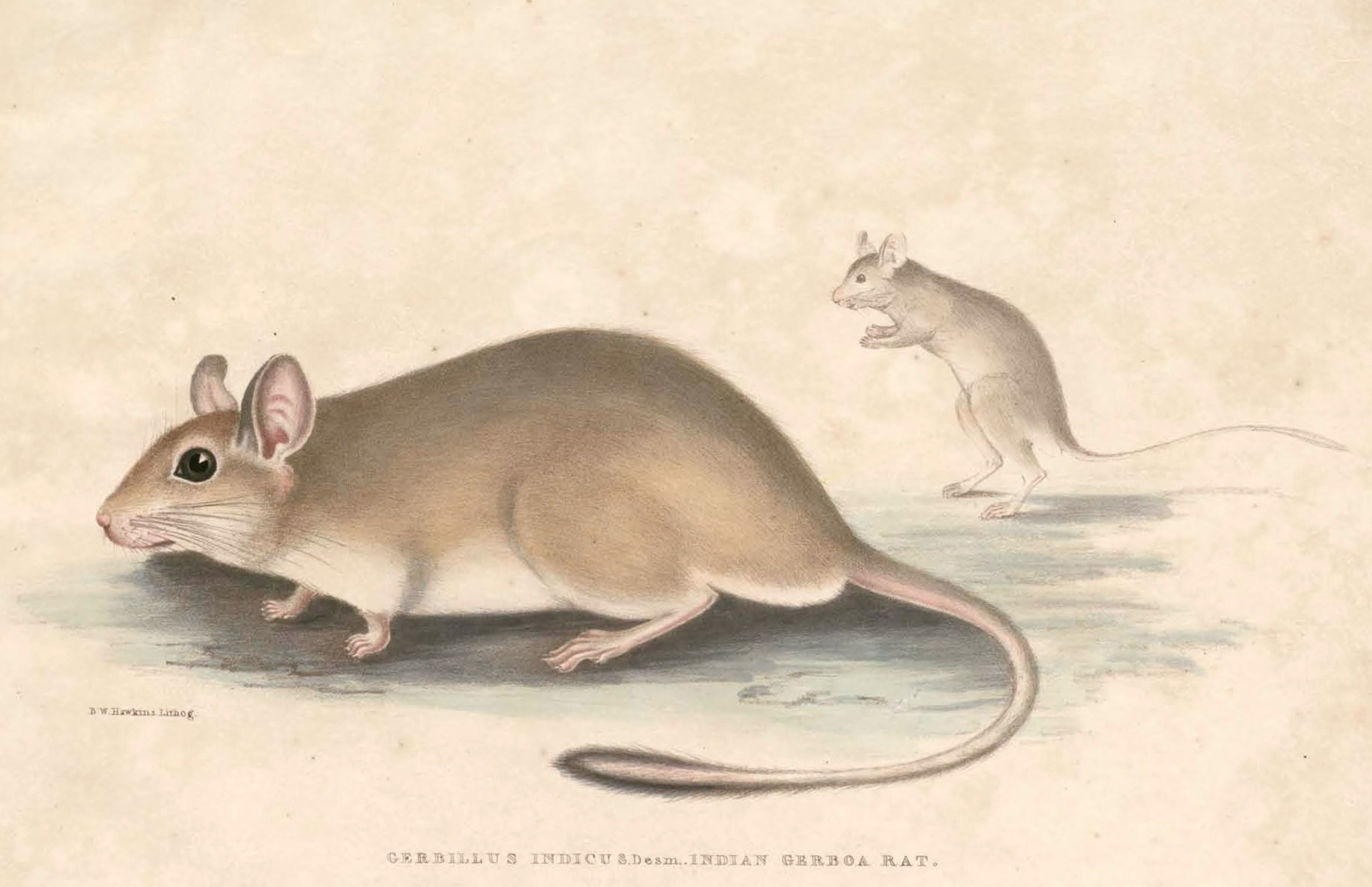

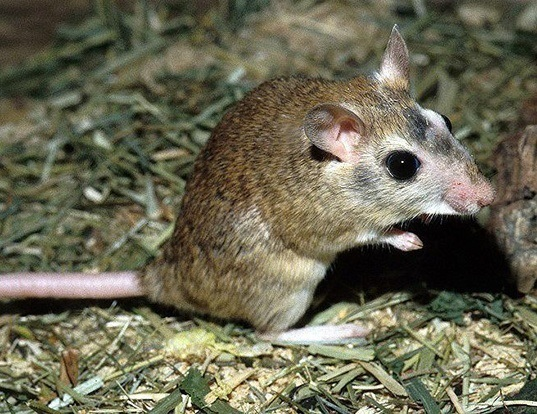

Conservation status
- Least Concern (IUCN 3.1)

Scientific classification
- Kingdom: Animalia
- Phylum: Chordata
- Class: Mammalia
- Order: Rodentia
- Family: Muridae
- Genus: Tatera; Lataste, 1882
- Species: T. indica

Binomial name
- Tatera indica (Hardwicke, 1807)

= Indian gerbil =

Species of rodent

The Indian gerbil (Tatera indica) also known as antelope rat, is a species of rodent in the family Muridae.

It is found in western and southern Asia, from Syria east through to Bangladesh.

It is the only species in the genus Tatera. Members of the genus Gerbilliscus have, historically, been placed in Tatera.

== Description ==
Head and body length is 17–20 cm. Tail is 20–21 cm. Dorsal surface including entire head is light brown or light brown with rusty wash. Underparts are white. Tail fully furred, dark blackish brown with grayish sides and prominent black tuft on tip. Fur on body soft, sparse underneath; tail fur is longer. Eyes are large and prominent. Bounding gait is distinguished when running.

== Reproduction ==
Both the sexes of this species lives apart. The relation between male and female gerbils is not known yet.

== Diet ==
Omnivorous. Known to eat grains, seeds, plants, roots, insects, reptiles and even small birds and mammals it can catch.

== Other sources ==
- Musser, G. G.; Carleton, M. D. (2005). "Superfamily Muroidea". In Wilson, D. E.; Reeder, D. M. (eds.). Mammal Species of the World: A Taxonomic and Geographic Reference (3rd ed.). Johns Hopkins University Press. p. 1242. ISBN 978-0-8018-8221-0. OCLC 62265494.
