= List of mammals of Ivory Coast =

This is a list of the mammal species recorded in Ivory Coast. Of the mammal species in Ivory Coast, one is critically endangered, ten are endangered, fourteen are vulnerable, and seventeen are near threatened.

The following tags are used to highlight each species' conservation status as assessed by the International Union for Conservation of Nature:

EX	Extinct	No reasonable doubt that the last individual has died.
EW	Extinct in the wild	Known only to survive in captivity or as naturalized population(s) well outside its previous range.
CR	Critically endangered	The species is in imminent risk of extinction in the wild.
EN	Endangered	The species is facing an extremely high risk of extinction in the wild.
VU	Vulnerable	The species is facing a high risk of extinction in the wild.
NT	Near threatened	The species does not meet any of the criteria that would categorise it as risking extinction but it is likely to do so in the future.
LC	Least concern	There are no current identifiable risks to the species.
DD	Data deficient	There is inadequate information to make an assessment of the risks to this species.

Some species were assessed using an earlier set of criteria. Species assessed using this system have the following instead of near threatened and least concern categories:

LR/cd	Lower risk/conservation dependent	Species which were the focus of conservation programmes and may have moved into a higher risk category if that programme was discontinued.
LR/nt	Lower risk/near threatened	Species which are close to being classified as vulnerable but are not the subject of conservation programmes.
LR/lc	Lower risk/least concern	Species for which there are no identifiable risks.

== Order: Afrosoricida (tenrecs and golden moles) ==
The order Afrosoricida contains the golden moles of southern Africa and the tenrecs of Madagascar and Africa, two families of small mammals that were traditionally part of the order Insectivora.

- Family: Tenrecidae (tenrecs)
  - Subfamily: Potamogalinae
    - Genus: Micropotamogale
      - Nimba otter shrew, M. lamottei VU

== Order: Hyracoidea (hyraxes) ==
The hyraxes are any of four species of fairly small, thickset, herbivorous mammals in the order Hyracoidea. About the size of a domestic cat they are well-furred, with rounded bodies and a stumpy tail. They are native to Africa and the Middle East.

- Family: Procaviidae (hyraxes)
  - Genus: Dendrohyrax
    - Western tree hyrax, D. dorsalis LC

== Order: Proboscidea (elephants) ==
The elephants comprise three living species and are the largest living land animals.

- Family: Elephantidae (elephants)
  - Genus: Loxodonta
    - African forest elephant, L. cyclotis CR

== Order: Sirenia (manatees and dugongs) ==
Sirenia is an order of fully aquatic, herbivorous mammals that inhabit rivers, estuaries, coastal marine waters, swamps, and marine wetlands. All four species are endangered.

- Family: Trichechidae
  - Genus: Trichechus
    - African manatee, Trichechus senegalensis VU

== Order: Primates ==
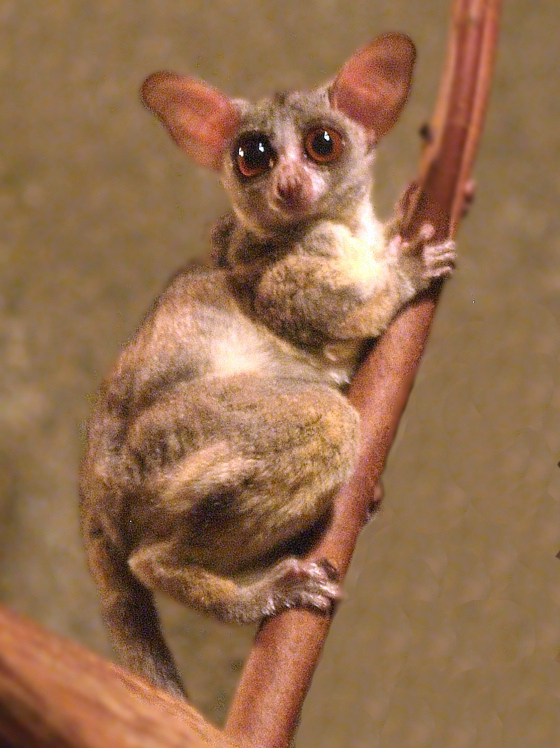
Senegal bushbaby

The order Primates contains humans and their closest relatives: lemurs, lorisoids, tarsiers, monkeys, and apes.

- Suborder: Strepsirrhini
  - Infraorder: Lemuriformes
    - Superfamily: Lorisoidea
      - Family: Lorisidae (lorises, bushbabies)
        - Genus: Perodicticus
          - Potto, Perodicticus potto LR/lc
      - Family: Galagidae
        - Genus: Galagoides
          - Prince Demidoff's bushbaby, Galagoides demidovii LR/lc
        - Genus: Galago
          - Senegal bushbaby, Galago senegalensis LR/lc
- Suborder: Haplorhini
  - Infraorder: Simiiformes
    - Parvorder: Catarrhini
      - Superfamily: Cercopithecoidea
        - Family: Cercopithecidae (Old World monkeys)
          - Genus: Erythrocebus
            - Patas monkey, Erythrocebus patas LR/lc
          - Genus: Chlorocebus
            - Green monkey, Chlorocebus sabaeus LR/lc
          - Genus: Cercopithecus
            - Campbell's mona monkey, Cercopithecus campbelli LR/lc
            - Diana monkey, Cercopithecus diana EN
            - Greater spot-nosed monkey, Cercopithecus nictitans LR/lc
            - Lesser spot-nosed monkey, Cercopithecus petaurista LR/lc
          - Genus: Papio
            - Olive baboon, Papio anubis LR/lc
          - Genus: Cercocebus
            - Sooty mangabey, Cercocebus atys LR/nt
            - Collared mangabey, Cercocebus torquatus LR/nt
          - Subfamily: Colobinae
            - Genus: Colobus
              - King colobus, Colobus polykomos LR/nt
              - Ursine colobus, Colobus vellerosus VU
            - Genus: Procolobus
              - Red colobus, Procolobus badius EN
              - Olive colobus, Procolobus verus LR/nt
      - Superfamily: Hominoidea
        - Family: Hominidae (great apes)
          - Subfamily: Homininae
            - Tribe: Panini
              - Genus: Pan
                - Common chimpanzee, Pan troglodytes EN

== Order: Rodentia (rodents) ==
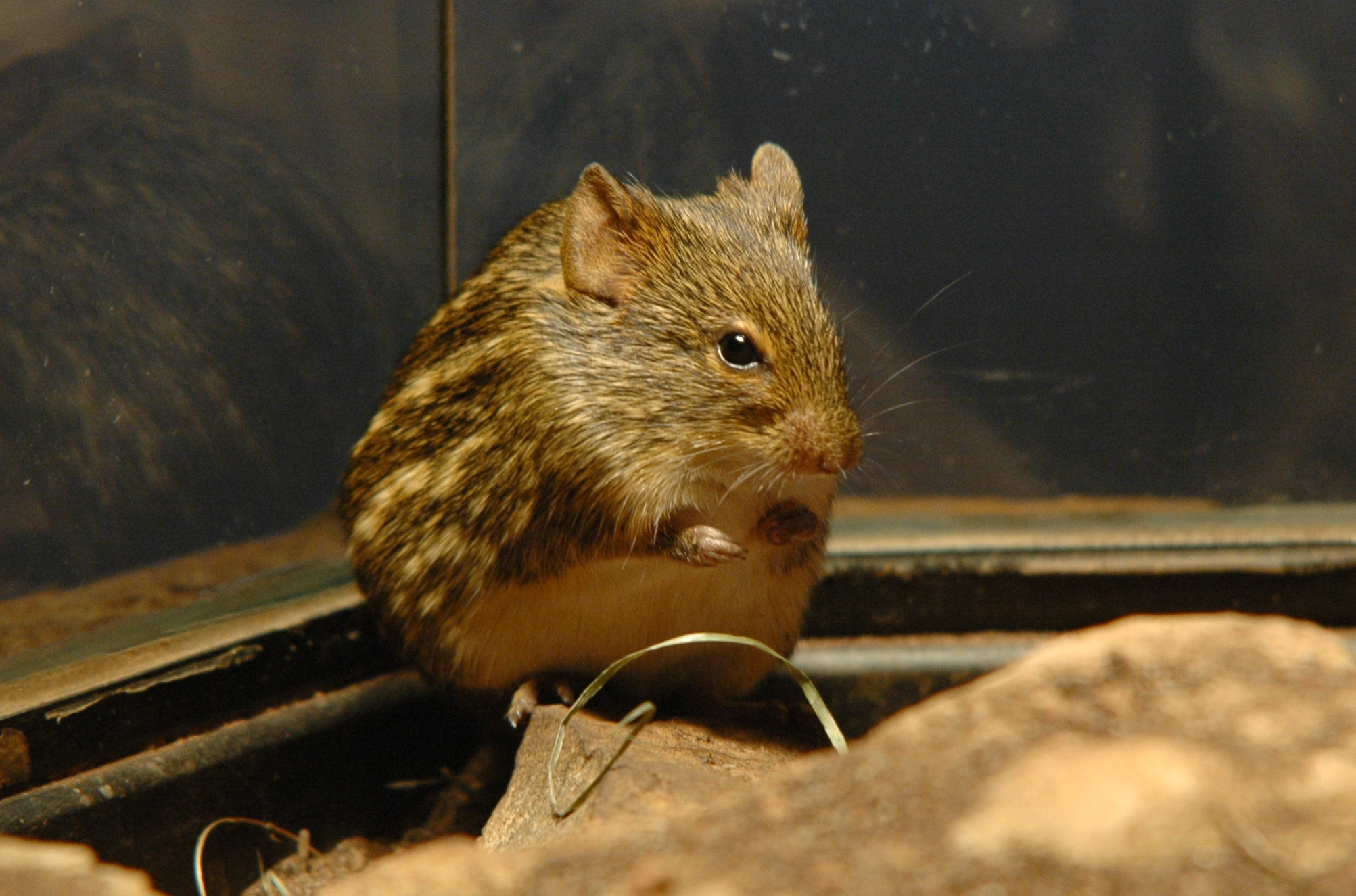
Typical striped grass mouse

Rodents make up the largest order of mammals, with over 40% of mammalian species. They have two incisors in the upper and lower jaw which grow continually and must be kept short by gnawing. Most rodents are small though the capybara can weigh up to 45 kg (99 lb).

- Suborder: Hystricognathi
  - Family: Hystricidae (Old World porcupines)
    - Genus: Hystrix
      - Crested porcupine, Hystrix cristata LC
  - Family: Thryonomyidae (cane rats)
    - Genus: Thryonomys
      - Greater cane rat, Thryonomys swinderianus LC
- Suborder: Sciurognathi
  - Family: Anomaluridae
    - Subfamily: Anomalurinae
      - Genus: Anomalurus
        - Lord Derby's scaly-tailed squirrel, Anomalurus derbianus LC
        - Pel's scaly-tailed squirrel, Anomalurus pelii NT
      - Genus: Anomalurops
        - Beecroft's scaly-tailed squirrel, Anomalurops beecrofti LC
    - Subfamily: Zenkerellinae
      - Genus: Idiurus
        - Long-eared flying mouse, Idiurus macrotis LC
  - Family: Sciuridae (squirrels)
    - Subfamily: Xerinae
      - Tribe: Xerini
        - Genus: Xerus
          - Striped ground squirrel, Xerus erythropus LC
      - Tribe: Protoxerini
        - Genus: Epixerus
          - Western palm squirrel, Epixerus ebii DD
        - Genus: Funisciurus
          - Fire-footed rope squirrel, Funisciurus pyrropus LC
          - Kintampo rope squirrel, Funisciurus substriatus DD
        - Genus: Heliosciurus
          - Gambian sun squirrel, Heliosciurus gambianus LC
          - Small sun squirrel, Heliosciurus punctatus DD
          - Red-legged sun squirrel, Heliosciurus rufobrachium LC
        - Genus: Paraxerus
          - Green bush squirrel, Paraxerus poensis LC
        - Genus: Protoxerus
          - Slender-tailed squirrel, Protoxerus aubinnii DD
          - Forest giant squirrel, Protoxerus stangeri LC
  - Family: Gliridae (dormice)
    - Subfamily: Graphiurinae
      - Genus: Graphiurus
        - Jentink's dormouse, Graphiurus crassicaudatus DD
  - Family: Nesomyidae
    - Subfamily: Dendromurinae
      - Genus: Steatomys
        - Northwestern fat mouse, Steatomys caurinus LC
    - Subfamily: Cricetomyinae
      - Genus: Cricetomys
        - Emin's pouched rat, Cricetomys emini LC
        - Gambian pouched rat, Cricetomys gambianus LC
  - Family: Muridae (mice, rats, voles, gerbils, hamsters, etc.)
    - Subfamily: Deomyinae
      - Genus: Lophuromys
        - Rusty-bellied brush-furred rat, Lophuromys sikapusi LC
      - Genus: Uranomys
        - Rudd's mouse, Uranomys ruddi LC
    - Subfamily: Gerbillinae
      - Genus: Tatera
        - Guinean gerbil, Tatera guineae LC
        - Kemp's gerbil, Tatera kempi LC
      - Genus: Taterillus
        - Gracile tateril, Taterillus gracilis LC
    - Subfamily: Murinae
      - Genus: Arvicanthis
        - Sudanian grass rat, Arvicanthis ansorgei LC
        - African grass rat, Arvicanthis niloticus LC
        - Guinean grass rat, Arvicanthis rufinus LC
      - Genus: Dasymys
        - West African shaggy rat, Dasymys rufulus LC
      - Genus: Dephomys
        - Defua rat, Dephomys defua LC
        - Ivory Coast rat, Dephomys eburnea LC
      - Genus: Grammomys
        - Bunting's thicket rat, Grammomys buntingi DD
        - Shining thicket rat, Grammomys rutilans LC
      - Genus: Hybomys
        - Miller's striped mouse, Hybomys planifrons LC
        - Temminck's striped mouse, Hybomys trivirgatus LC
      - Genus: Hylomyscus
        - Allen's wood mouse, Hylomyscus alleni LC
        - Baer's wood mouse, Hylomyscus baeri EN
      - Genus: Lemniscomys
        - Bellier's striped grass mouse, Lemniscomys bellieri LC
        - Senegal one-striped grass mouse, Lemniscomys linulus DD
        - Typical striped grass mouse, Lemniscomys striatus LC
        - Heuglin's striped grass mouse, Lemniscomys zebra LC
      - Genus: Malacomys
        - Cansdale's swamp rat, Malacomys cansdalei LC
        - Edward's swamp rat, Malacomys edwardsi LC
      - Genus: Mastomys
        - Guinea multimammate mouse, Mastomys erythroleucus LC
        - Natal multimammate mouse, Mastomys natalensis LC
      - Genus: Mus
        - Baoule's mouse, Mus baoulei LC
        - Hausa mouse, Mus haussa LC
        - Matthey's mouse, Mus mattheyi LC
        - African pygmy mouse, Mus minutoides LC
        - Peters's mouse, Mus setulosus LC
      - Genus: Mylomys
        - African groove-toothed rat, Mylomys dybowskii LC
      - Genus: Oenomys
        - Ghana rufous-nosed rat, Oenomys ornatus DD
      - Genus: Praomys
        - Dalton's mouse, Praomys daltoni LC
        - Forest soft-furred mouse, Praomys rostratus LC
        - Tullberg's soft-furred mouse, Praomys tullbergi LC

== Order: Lagomorpha (lagomorphs) ==
The lagomorphs comprise two families, Leporidae (hares and rabbits), and Ochotonidae (pikas). Though they can resemble rodents, and were classified as a superfamily in that order until the early 20th century, they have since been considered a separate order. They differ from rodents in a number of physical characteristics, such as having four incisors in the upper jaw rather than two.

- Family: Leporidae (rabbits, hares)
  - Genus: Lepus
    - African savanna hare, Lepus microtis LR/lc

== Order: Erinaceomorpha (hedgehogs and gymnures) ==
The order Erinaceomorpha contains a single family, Erinaceidae, which comprise the hedgehogs and gymnures. The hedgehogs are easily recognised by their spines while gymnures look more like large rats.

- Family: Erinaceidae (hedgehogs)
  - Subfamily: Erinaceinae
    - Genus: Atelerix
      - Four-toed hedgehog, Atelerix albiventris LR/lc

== Order: Soricomorpha (shrews, moles, and solenodons) ==
The "shrew-forms" are insectivorous mammals. The shrews and solenodons closely resemble mice while the moles are stout-bodied burrowers.

- Family: Soricidae (shrews)
  - Subfamily: Crocidurinae
    - Genus: Crocidura
      - Buettikofer's shrew, Crocidura buettikoferi LC
      - Crosse's shrew, Crocidura crossei LC
      - Doucet's musk shrew, Crocidura douceti DD
      - Fox's shrew, Crocidura foxi LC
      - Bicolored musk shrew, Crocidura fuscomurina LC
      - Large-headed shrew, Crocidura grandiceps NT
      - Lamotte's shrew, Crocidura lamottei LC
      - West African long-tailed shrew, Crocidura muricauda LC
      - Nigerian shrew, Crocidura nigeriae LC
      - Nimba shrew, Crocidura nimbae VU
      - West African pygmy shrew, Crocidura obscurior LC
      - African giant shrew, Crocidura olivieri LC
      - Fraser's musk shrew, Crocidura poensis LC
      - Therese's shrew, Crocidura theresae LC
      - Wimmer's shrew, Crocidura wimmeri CR
    - Genus: Sylvisorex
      - Climbing shrew, Sylvisorex megalura LC

== Order: Chiroptera (bats) ==
The bats' most distinguishing feature is that their forelimbs are developed as wings, making them the only mammals capable of flight. Bat species account for about 20% of all mammals.

- Family: Pteropodidae (flying foxes, Old World fruit bats)
  - Subfamily: Pteropodinae
    - Genus: Eidolon
      - Straw-coloured fruit bat, Eidolon helvum LC
    - Genus: Epomophorus
      - Gambian epauletted fruit bat, Epomophorus gambianus LC
    - Genus: Epomops
      - Buettikofer's epauletted fruit bat, Epomops buettikoferi LC
      - Franquet's epauletted fruit bat, Epomops franqueti LC
    - Genus: Hypsignathus
      - Hammer-headed bat, Hypsignathus monstrosus LC
    - Genus: Lissonycteris
      - Smith's fruit bat, Lissonycteris smithi LC
    - Genus: Micropteropus
      - Peters's dwarf epauletted fruit bat, Micropteropus pusillus LC
    - Genus: Myonycteris
      - Little collared fruit bat, Myonycteris torquata LC
    - Genus: Nanonycteris
      - Veldkamp's dwarf epauletted fruit bat, Nanonycteris veldkampi LC
    - Genus: Rousettus
      - Egyptian fruit bat, Rousettus aegyptiacus LC
    - Genus: Scotonycteris
      - Pohle's fruit bat, Scotonycteris ophiodon EN
      - Zenker's fruit bat, Scotonycteris zenkeri NT
  - Subfamily: Macroglossinae
    - Genus: Megaloglossus
      - Woermann's bat, Megaloglossus woermanni LC
- Family: Vespertilionidae
  - Subfamily: Kerivoulinae
    - Genus: Kerivoula
      - Copper woolly bat, Kerivoula cuprosa NT
      - Lesser woolly bat, Kerivoula lanosa LC
      - Spurrell's woolly bat, Kerivoula phalaena NT
  - Subfamily: Myotinae
    - Genus: Myotis
      - Rufous mouse-eared bat, Myotis bocagii LC
  - Subfamily: Vespertilioninae
    - Genus: Glauconycteris
      - Beatrix's bat, Glauconycteris beatrix NT
      - Abo bat, Glauconycteris poensis LC
      - Pied bat, Glauconycteris superba VU
    - Genus: Hypsugo
      - Broad-headed pipistrelle, Hypsugo crassulus LC
    - Genus: Mimetillus
      - Moloney's mimic bat, Mimetillus moloneyi LC
    - Genus: Neoromicia
      - Dark-brown serotine, Neoromicia brunneus NT
      - Cape serotine, Neoromicia capensis LC
      - Tiny serotine, Neoromicia guineensis LC
      - Banana pipistrelle, Neoromicia nanus LC
      - Somali serotine, Neoromicia somalicus LC
      - White-winged serotine, Neoromicia tenuipinnis LC
    - Genus: Pipistrellus
      - Tiny pipistrelle, Pipistrellus nanulus LC
    - Genus: Scotoecus
      - Light-winged lesser house bat, Scotoecus albofuscus DD
      - Dark-winged lesser house bat, Scotoecus hirundo DD
    - Genus: Scotophilus
      - African yellow bat, Scotophilus dinganii LC
      - White-bellied yellow bat, Scotophilus leucogaster LC
      - Schreber's yellow bat, Scotophilus nigrita NT
      - Robbins's yellow bat, Scotophilus nucella VU
      - Nut-colored yellow bat, Scotophilus nux LC
      - Greenish yellow bat, Scotophilus viridis LC
- Family: Molossidae
  - Genus: Chaerephon
    - Duke of Abruzzi's free-tailed bat, Chaerephon aloysiisabaudiae NT
    - Gland-tailed free-tailed bat, Chaerephon bemmeleni LC
    - Lappet-eared free-tailed bat, Chaerephon major LC
    - Little free-tailed bat, Chaerephon pumila LC
  - Genus: Mops
    - Sierra Leone free-tailed bat, Mops brachypterus LC
    - Angolan free-tailed bat, Mops condylurus LC
    - Mongalla free-tailed bat, Mops demonstrator NT
    - Dwarf free-tailed bat, Mops nanulus LC
    - Spurrell's free-tailed bat, Mops spurrelli LC
    - Railer bat, Mops thersites LC
    - Trevor's free-tailed bat, Mops trevori VU
  - Genus: Myopterus
    - Daubenton's free-tailed bat, Myopterus daubentonii NT
  - Genus: Otomops
    - Large-eared free-tailed bat, Otomops martiensseni NT
- Family: Emballonuridae
  - Genus: Coleura
    - African sheath-tailed bat, Coleura afra LC
  - Genus: Saccolaimus
    - Pel's pouched bat, Saccolaimus peli NT
  - Genus: Taphozous
    - Mauritian tomb bat, Taphozous mauritianus LC
- Family: Nycteridae
  - Genus: Nycteris
    - Bate's slit-faced bat, Nycteris arge LC
    - Gambian slit-faced bat, Nycteris gambiensis LC
    - Large slit-faced bat, Nycteris grandis LC
    - Hairy slit-faced bat, Nycteris hispida LC
    - Intermediate slit-faced bat, Nycteris intermedia NT
    - Large-eared slit-faced bat, Nycteris macrotis LC
    - Ja slit-faced bat, Nycteris major VU
    - Dwarf slit-faced bat, Nycteris nana LC
    - Egyptian slit-faced bat, Nycteris thebaica LC
- Family: Megadermatidae
  - Genus: Lavia
    - Yellow-winged bat, Lavia frons LC
- Family: Rhinolophidae
  - Subfamily: Rhinolophinae
    - Genus: Rhinolophus
      - Halcyon horseshoe bat, Rhinolophus alcyone LC
      - Rüppell's horseshoe bat, Rhinolophus fumigatus LC
      - Guinean horseshoe bat, Rhinolophus guineensis VU
      - Lander's horseshoe bat, Rhinolophus landeri LC
      - Bushveld horseshoe bat, Rhinolophus simulator LC
  - Subfamily: Hipposiderinae
    - Genus: Hipposideros
      - Aba roundleaf bat, Hipposideros abae NT
      - Benito roundleaf bat, Hipposideros beatus LC
      - Sundevall's roundleaf bat, Hipposideros caffer LC
      - Cyclops roundleaf bat, Hipposideros cyclops LC
      - Sooty roundleaf bat, Hipposideros fuliginosus NT
      - Giant roundleaf bat, Hipposideros gigas LC
      - Jones's roundleaf bat, Hipposideros jonesi NT
      - Aellen's roundleaf bat, Hipposideros marisae EN
      - Noack's roundleaf bat, Hipposideros ruber LC

== Order: Pholidota (pangolins) ==
The order Pholidota comprises the eight species of pangolin. Pangolins are anteaters and have the powerful claws, elongated snout and long tongue seen in the other unrelated anteater species.

- Family: Manidae
  - Genus: Manis
    - Giant pangolin, Manis gigantea LR/lc
    - Long-tailed pangolin, Manis tetradactyla LR/lc
    - Tree pangolin, Manis tricuspis LR/lc

== Order: Cetacea (whales) ==
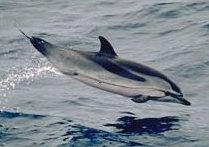
Striped dolphin

Orcas

The order Cetacea includes whales, dolphins and porpoises. They are the mammals most fully adapted to aquatic life with a spindle-shaped nearly hairless body, protected by a thick layer of blubber, and forelimbs and tail modified to provide propulsion underwater.

- Suborder: Mysticeti
  - Family: Balaenopteridae
    - Subfamily: Balaenopterinae
      - Genus: Balaenoptera
        - Common minke whale, Balaenoptera acutorostrata VU
        - Sei whale, Balaenoptera borealis EN
        - Bryde's whale, Balaenoptera brydei EN
        - Blue whale, Balaenoptera musculus EN
        - Fin whale, Balaenoptera physalus EN
    - Subfamily: Megapterinae
      - Genus: Megaptera
        - Humpback whale, Megaptera novaeangliae VU
- Suborder: Odontoceti
  - Superfamily: Platanistoidea
    - Family: Phocoenidae
      - Genus: Phocoena
        - Harbour porpoise, Phocoena phocoena VU
    - Family: Physeteridae
      - Genus: Physeter
        - Sperm whale, Physeter macrocephalus VU
    - Family: Kogiidae
      - Genus: Kogia
        - Pygmy sperm whale, Kogia breviceps DD
        - Dwarf sperm whale, Kogia sima DD
    - Family: Ziphidae
      - Genus: Mesoplodon
          - Blainville's beaked whale, Mesoplodon densirostris DD
          - Gervais' beaked whale, Mesoplodon europaeus DD
      - Genus: Ziphius
          - Cuvier's beaked whale, Ziphius cavirostris DD
    - Family: Delphinidae (marine dolphins)
        - Genus: Orcinus
        - Orca, O. orca DD
        - Genus: Feresa
        - Pygmy killer whale, Feresa attenuata DD
        - Genus: Pseudorca
        - False killer whale, Pseudorca crassidens DD
      - Genus: Delphinus
        - Short-beaked common dolphin, Delphinus delphis LR/cd
        - Long-beaked common dolphin, Delphinus capensis DD
      - Genus: Sousa
        - Atlantic humpback dolphin, Sousa teuszii CR
      - Genus: Lagenodelphis
        - Fraser's dolphin, Lagenodelphis hosei DD
      - Genus: Stenella
        - Pantropical spotted dolphin, Stenella attenuata LR/cd
        - Clymene dolphin, Stenella clymene DD
        - Striped dolphin, Stenella coeruleoalba DD
        - Atlantic spotted dolphin, Stenella frontalis DD
        - Spinner dolphin, Stenella longirostris LR/cd
      - Genus: Steno
        - Rough-toothed dolphin, Steno bredanensis DD
      - Genus: Tursiops
        - Common bottlenose dolphin, Tursiops truncatus LC
      - Genus: Globicephala
        - Short-finned pilot whale, Globicephala macrorhynchus DD
      - Genus: Grampus
        - Risso's dolphin, Grampus griseus DD
      - Genus: Peponocephala
        - Melon-headed whale, Peponocephala electra DD

== Order: Carnivora (carnivorans) ==
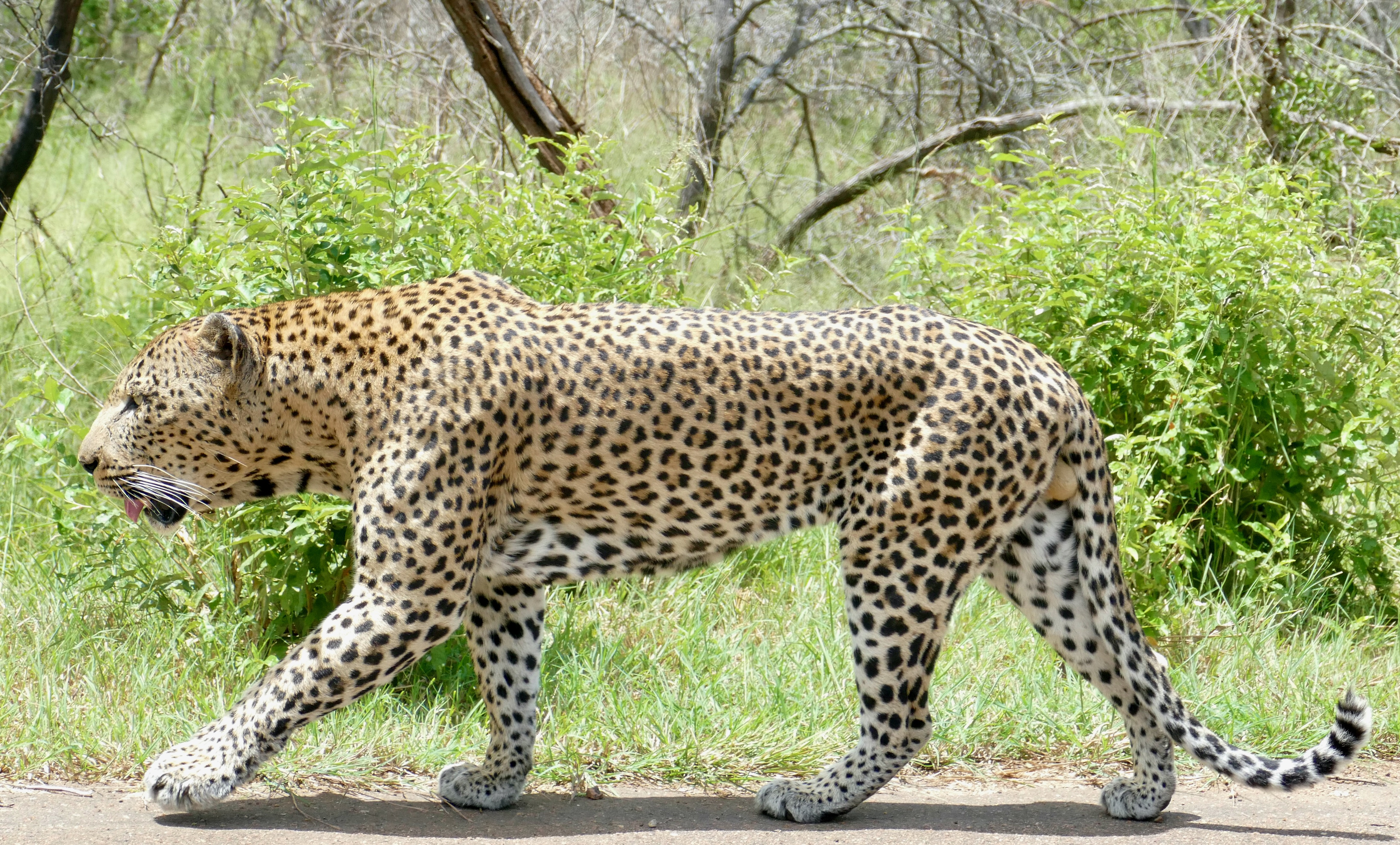
Leopard

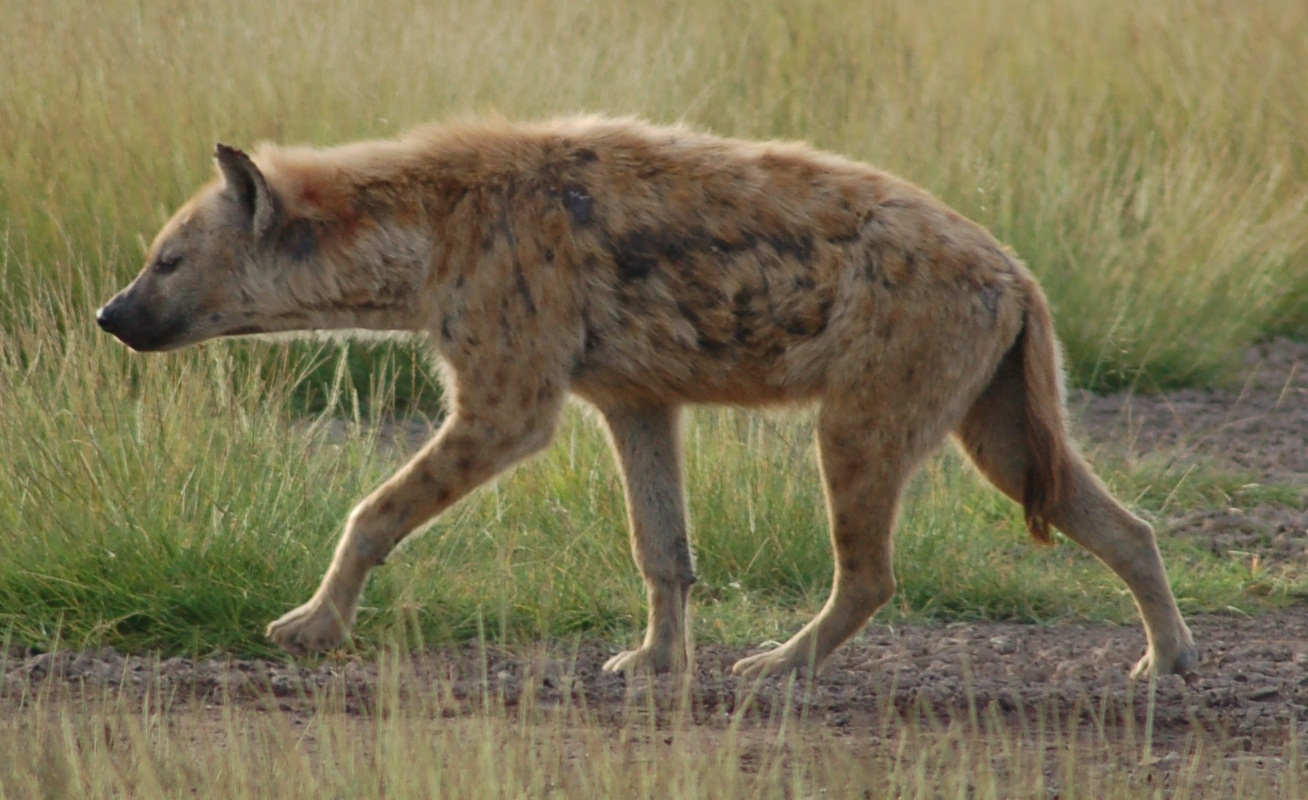
Spotted hyena

There are over 260 species of carnivorans, the majority of which feed primarily on meat. They have a characteristic skull shape and dentition.

- Suborder: Feliformia
  - Family: Felidae (cats)
    - Subfamily: Felinae
      - Genus: Caracal
        - Caracal, C. caracal LC
        - African golden cat, C. aurata VU
      - Genus: Leptailurus
        - Serval, L. serval LC
    - Subfamily: Pantherinae
      - Genus: Panthera
        - Lion, Panthera leo VU
        - Leopard, Panthera pardus VU
  - Family: Viverridae
    - Subfamily: Viverrinae
      - Genus: Civettictis
        - African civet, Civettictis civetta LC
      - Genus: Genetta
        - Johnston's genet, Genetta johnstoni LC
        - Rusty-spotted genet, Genetta maculata LC
        - Hausa genet, Genetta thierryi LR/lc
      - Genus: Poiana
        - Leighton's linsang, Poiana leightoni VU
  - Family: Nandiniidae
    - Genus: Nandinia
      - African palm civet, Nandinia binotata LC
  - Family: Herpestidae (mongooses)
    - Genus: Atilax
      - Marsh mongoose, Atilax paludinosus LC
    - Genus: Crossarchus
      - Common kusimanse, Crossarchus obscurus LC
    - Genus: Herpestes
      - Egyptian mongoose, Herpestes ichneumon LC
      - Common slender mongoose, Herpestes sanguineus LC
    - Genus: Ichneumia
      - White-tailed mongoose, Ichneumia albicauda LC
    - Genus: Liberiictis
      - Liberian mongoose, Liberiictis kuhni EN
    - Genus: Mungos
      - Gambian mongoose, Mungos gambianus LC
  - Family: Hyaenidae (hyaenas)
    - Genus: Crocuta
      - Spotted hyena, Crocuta crocuta LC
- Suborder: Caniformia
  - Family: Canidae (dogs, foxes)
    - Genus: Lupulella
      - Side-striped jackal, L. adusta LC
    - Genus: Lycaon
      - African wild dog, L. pictus EN possibly extirpated
  - Family: Mustelidae (mustelids)
    - Genus: Ictonyx
      - Striped polecat, Ictonyx striatus LC
    - Genus: Mellivora
      - Honey badger, Mellivora capensis LC
    - Genus: Hydrictis
      - Speckle-throated otter, H. maculicollis LC
    - Genus: Aonyx
      - African clawless otter, Aonyx capensis LC

== Order: Artiodactyla (even-toed ungulates) ==
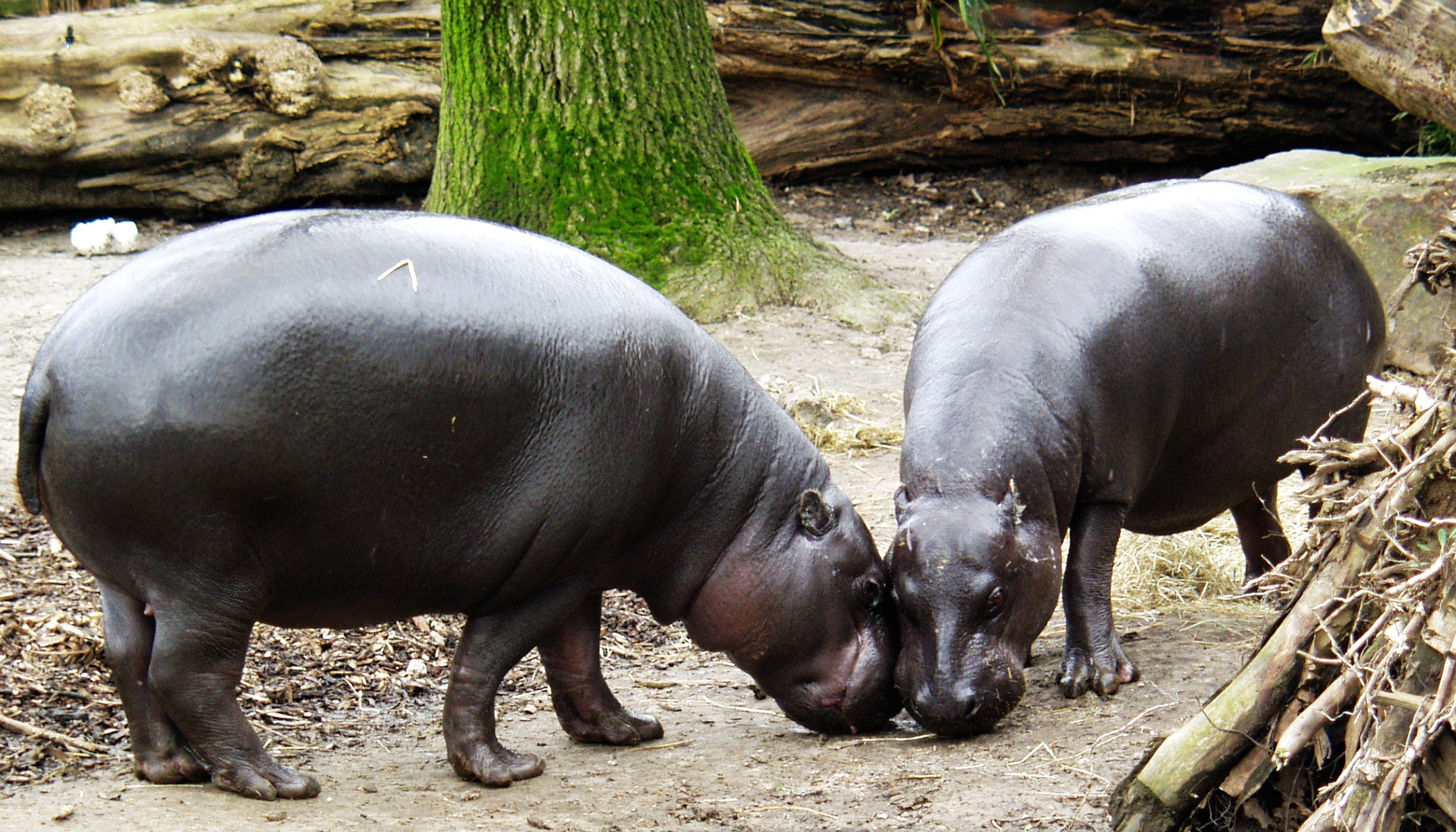
Pygmy hippopotamus

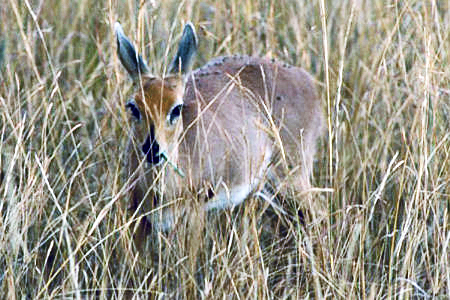
Oribi

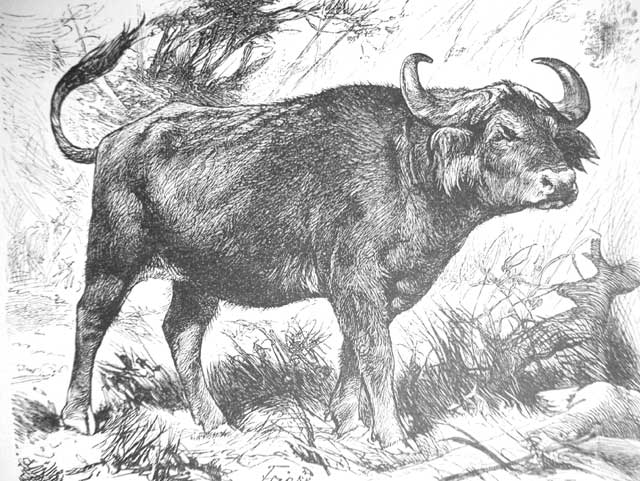
African buffalo

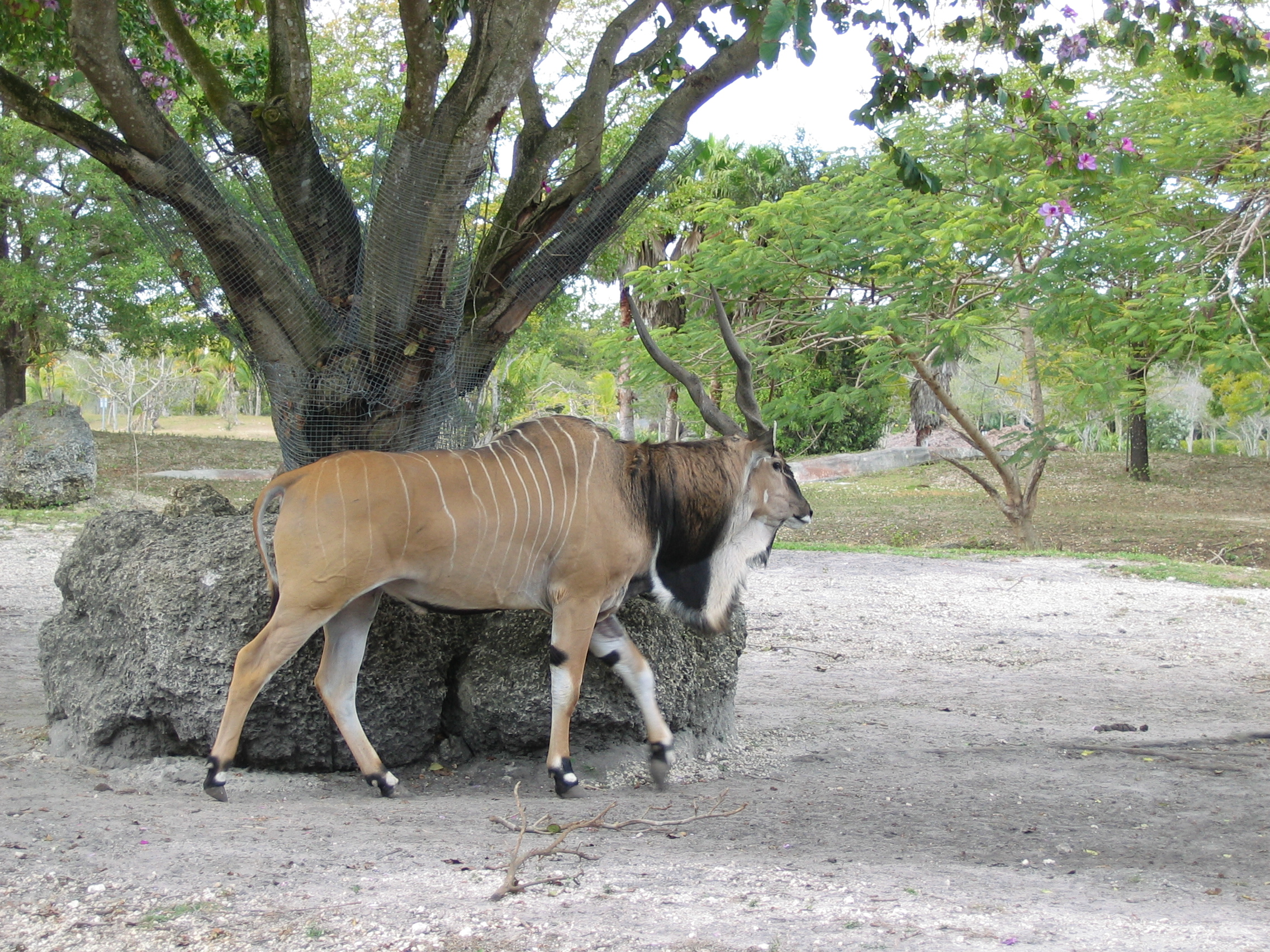
Giant eland

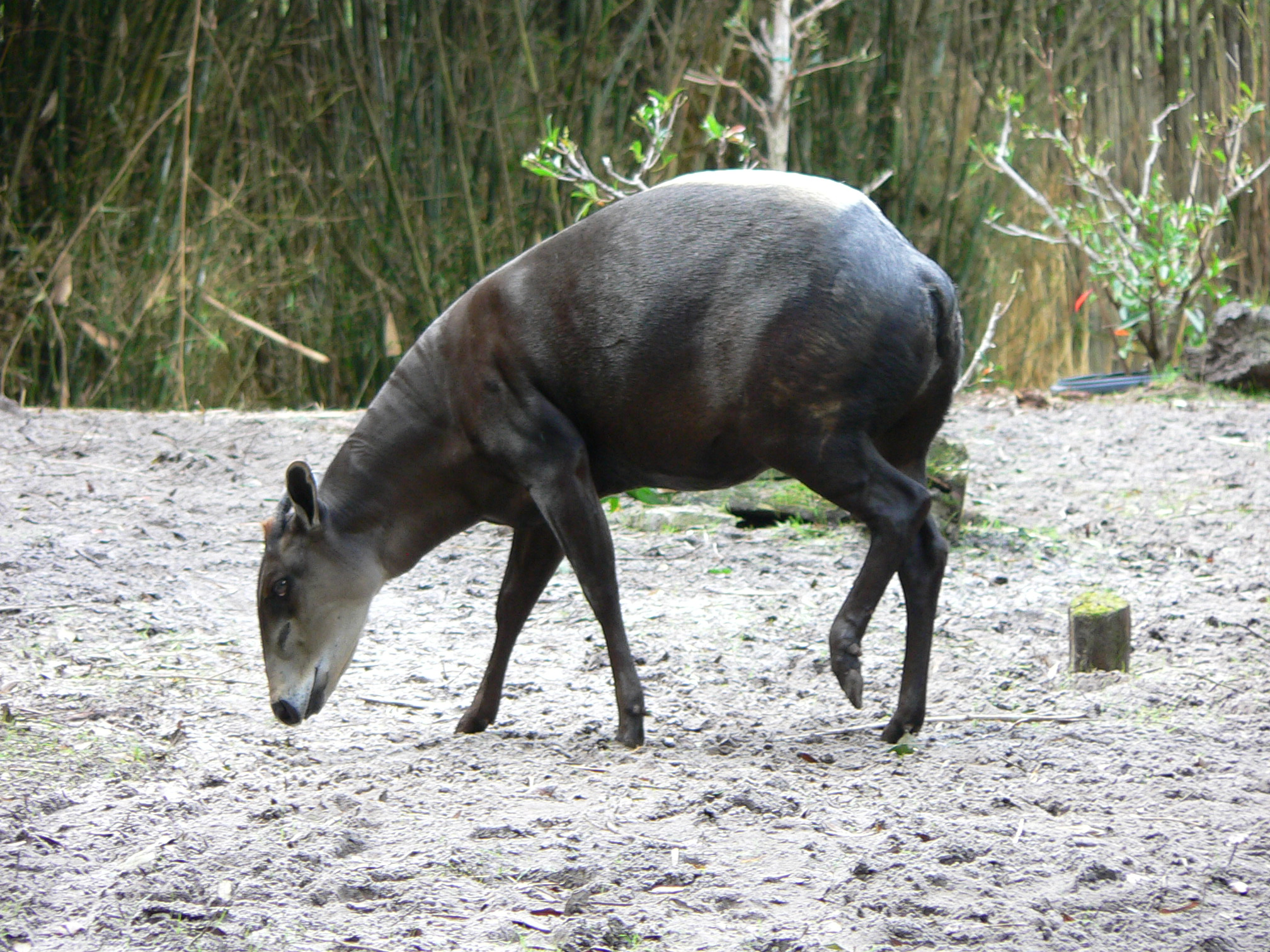
Yellow-backed duiker

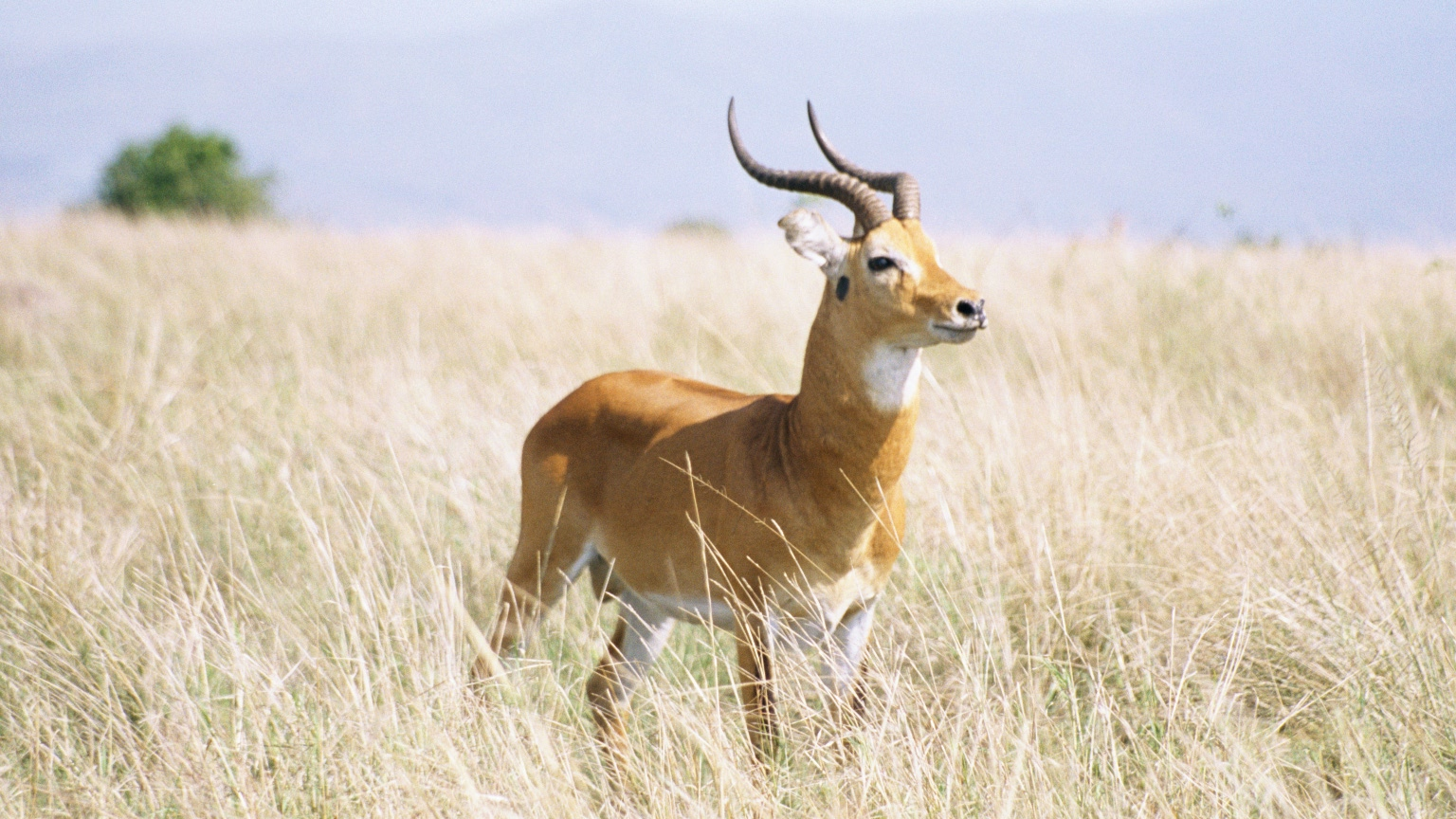
Kob

The even-toed ungulates are ungulates whose weight is borne about equally by the third and fourth toes, rather than mostly or entirely by the third as in perissodactyls. There are about 220 artiodactyl species, including many that are of great economic importance to humans.

- Family: Suidae (pigs)
  - Subfamily: Phacochoerinae
    - Genus: Phacochoerus
      - Common warthog, Phacochoerus africanus LR/lc
  - Subfamily: Suinae
    - Genus: Hylochoerus
      - Giant forest hog, Hylochoerus meinertzhageni LR/lc
    - Genus: Potamochoerus
      - Red river hog, Potamochoerus porcus LR/lc
- Family: Hippopotamidae (hippopotamuses)
  - Genus: Choeropsis
    - Pygmy hippopotamus, Choeropsis liberiensis EN
  - Genus: Hippopotamus
    - Hippopotamus, Hippopotamus amphibius VU
- Family: Tragulidae
  - Genus: Hyemoschus
    - Water chevrotain, Hyemoschus aquaticus DD
- Family: Bovidae (cattle, antelope, sheep, goats)
  - Subfamily: Alcelaphinae
    - Genus: Alcelaphus
      - Hartebeest, Alcelaphus buselaphus LR/cd
  - Subfamily: Antilopinae
    - Genus: Neotragus
      - Royal antelope, Neotragus pygmaeus LR/nt
    - Genus: Ourebia
      - Oribi, Ourebia ourebi LR/cd
  - Subfamily: Bovinae
    - Genus: Syncerus
      - African buffalo, Syncerus caffer LR/cd
    - Genus: Tragelaphus
      - Giant eland, Tragelaphus derbianus LR/nt extirpated
      - Bongo, Tragelaphus eurycerus LR/nt
      - Bushbuck, Tragelaphus scriptus LR/lc
      - Sitatunga, Tragelaphus spekii LR/nt
  - Subfamily: Cephalophinae
    - Genus: Cephalophus
      - Bay duiker, Cephalophus dorsalis LR/nt
      - Jentink's duiker, Cephalophus jentinki VU
      - Maxwell's duiker, Cephalophus maxwellii LR/nt
      - Blue duiker, Cephalophus monticola LR/lc
      - Black duiker, Cephalophus niger LR/nt
      - Ogilby's duiker, Cephalophus ogilbyi LR/nt
      - Red-flanked duiker, Cephalophus rufilatus LR/cd
      - Yellow-backed duiker, Cephalophus silvicultor LR/nt
      - Zebra duiker, Cephalophus zebra VU
    - Genus: Sylvicapra
      - Common duiker, Sylvicapra grimmia LR/lc
  - Subfamily: Hippotraginae
    - Genus: Hippotragus
      - Roan antelope, Hippotragus equinus LR/cd
  - Subfamily: Reduncinae
    - Genus: Kobus
      - Waterbuck, Kobus ellipsiprymnus LR/cd
      - Kob, Kobus kob LR/cd
    - Genus: Redunca
      - Bohor reedbuck, Redunca redunca LR/cd

== See also ==
- List of chordate orders
- Lists of mammals by region
- Mammal classification
- List of mammals described in the 2000s
