= Pygmy mouse =

Pygmy mouse may refer to:

- Baiomys, a North American genus:
  - Northern pygmy mouse (Baiomys taylori)
  - Southern pygmy mouse (Baiomys musculus)
- Nannomys, an African subgenus:
  - Desert pygmy mouse (Mus indutus)
  - African pygmy mouse, South African Pygmy Mouse, or just Pygmy Mouse (Mus minutoides)
  - Subsaharan pygmy mouse (Mus musculoides)
  - Free State pygmy mouse (Mus orangiae)
  - Setzer's pygmy mouse (Mus setzeri)
  - Thomas's pygmy mouse (Mus sorella)
  - Gray-bellied pygmy mouse (Mus triton)
- Pygmy mouse (mutant) (pg), a mutant strain of the laboratory mouse
