= Harenna mouse =

Scientific classification
- Kingdom: Animalia
- Phylum: Chordata
- Class: Mammalia
- Order: Rodentia
- Family: Muridae
- Genus: Mus
- Subgenus: Nannomys
- Species: M. harennensis

Binomial name
- Mus harennensis Lavrenchenko & Bryja, 2022

Species of mammal

The Harenna mouse (Mus harennensis) is a species of mouse in the subgenus Nannomys found in the Harenna Forest, Bale Mountains National Park, southern Ethiopia.

== See also ==
- List of living mammal species described in the 2020s
