= Delicate mouse =

Conservation status
- Least Concern (IUCN 3.1)

Scientific classification
- Kingdom: Animalia
- Phylum: Chordata
- Class: Mammalia
- Order: Rodentia
- Family: Muridae
- Genus: Mus
- Subgenus: Nannomys
- Species: M. tenellus

Binomial name
- Mus tenellus (Thomas, 1903)

Species of rodent

The delicate mouse (Mus tenellus) is a species of rodent in the family Muridae. It is found in Ethiopia, Kenya, Somalia, Sudan, Tanzania, and possibly Eritrea. Its natural habitat is dry savanna.
