= Gounda mouse =

Conservation status
- Data Deficient (IUCN 3.1)

Scientific classification
- Kingdom: Animalia
- Phylum: Chordata
- Class: Mammalia
- Infraclass: Placentalia
- Order: Rodentia
- Family: Muridae
- Genus: Mus
- Subgenus: Nannomys
- Species: M. goundae

Binomial name
- Mus goundae F. Petter & Genest, 1970

Species of rodent

The Gounda mouse (Mus goundae) is a species of rodent in the family Muridae. It is found only in Central African Republic, around the Gounda River. Its natural habitat is moist savanna.
