= Callewaert's mouse =

Conservation status
- Data Deficient (IUCN 3.1)

Scientific classification
- Kingdom: Animalia
- Phylum: Chordata
- Class: Mammalia
- Infraclass: Placentalia
- Order: Rodentia
- Family: Muridae
- Genus: Mus
- Subgenus: Nannomys
- Species: M. callewaerti

Binomial name
- Mus callewaerti (Thomas, 1925)

Species of rodent

Callewaert's mouse (Mus callewaerti) is a species of rodent in the family Muridae. It is found in the highlands of Katanga in the Democratic Republic of the Congo. Its natural habitat is dry savanna.
