= Neave's mouse =

Conservation status
- Data Deficient (IUCN 3.1)

Scientific classification
- Kingdom: Animalia
- Phylum: Chordata
- Class: Mammalia
- Infraclass: Placentalia
- Order: Rodentia
- Family: Muridae
- Genus: Mus
- Subgenus: Nannomys
- Species: M. neavei

Binomial name
- Mus neavei (Thomas, 1910)

Species of rodent

Neave's mouse (Mus neavei) is a species of rodent in the family Muridae. It is found in Democratic Republic of the Congo, Mozambique, South Africa, Tanzania, Zambia, and Zimbabwe. Its natural habitat is dry savanna.
