= Mahomet mouse =

Conservation status
- Least Concern (IUCN 3.1)

Scientific classification
- Kingdom: Animalia
- Phylum: Chordata
- Class: Mammalia
- Infraclass: Placentalia
- Order: Rodentia
- Family: Muridae
- Genus: Mus
- Subgenus: Nannomys
- Species: M. mahomet

Binomial name
- Mus mahomet Rhoads, 1896

Species of rodent

The Mahomet mouse (Mus mahomet) is a species of rodent in the family Muridae. It is found in Ethiopia, Kenya, and Uganda. Its natural habitats are subtropical or tropical moist montane forests and subtropical or tropical high-altitude shrubland. It is threatened by habitat loss.

It was described by Samuel N. Rhoads in 1896, who named it for Sheikh Mahomet, Ethiopia, where it was collected by A. Donaldson Smith.
