= Mus lepidoides =

Scientific classification
- Kingdom: Animalia
- Phylum: Chordata
- Class: Mammalia
- Order: Rodentia
- Family: Muridae
- Genus: Mus
- Species: M. lepidoides

Binomial name
- Mus lepidoides Fry, 1931

Species of rodent

Mus lepidoides is a species of rodent in the family Muridae.
