= Toad mouse =

Conservation status
- Least Concern (IUCN 3.1)

Scientific classification
- Kingdom: Animalia
- Phylum: Chordata
- Class: Mammalia
- Infraclass: Placentalia
- Order: Rodentia
- Family: Muridae
- Genus: Mus
- Subgenus: Nannomys
- Species: M. bufo

Binomial name
- Mus bufo (Thomas, 1906)

Species of rodent

The toad mouse (Mus bufo) is a species of rodent in the family Muridae. It is found in Burundi, Democratic Republic of the Congo, Rwanda, and Uganda. Its natural habitats are subtropical or tropical moist montane forests and arable land.
