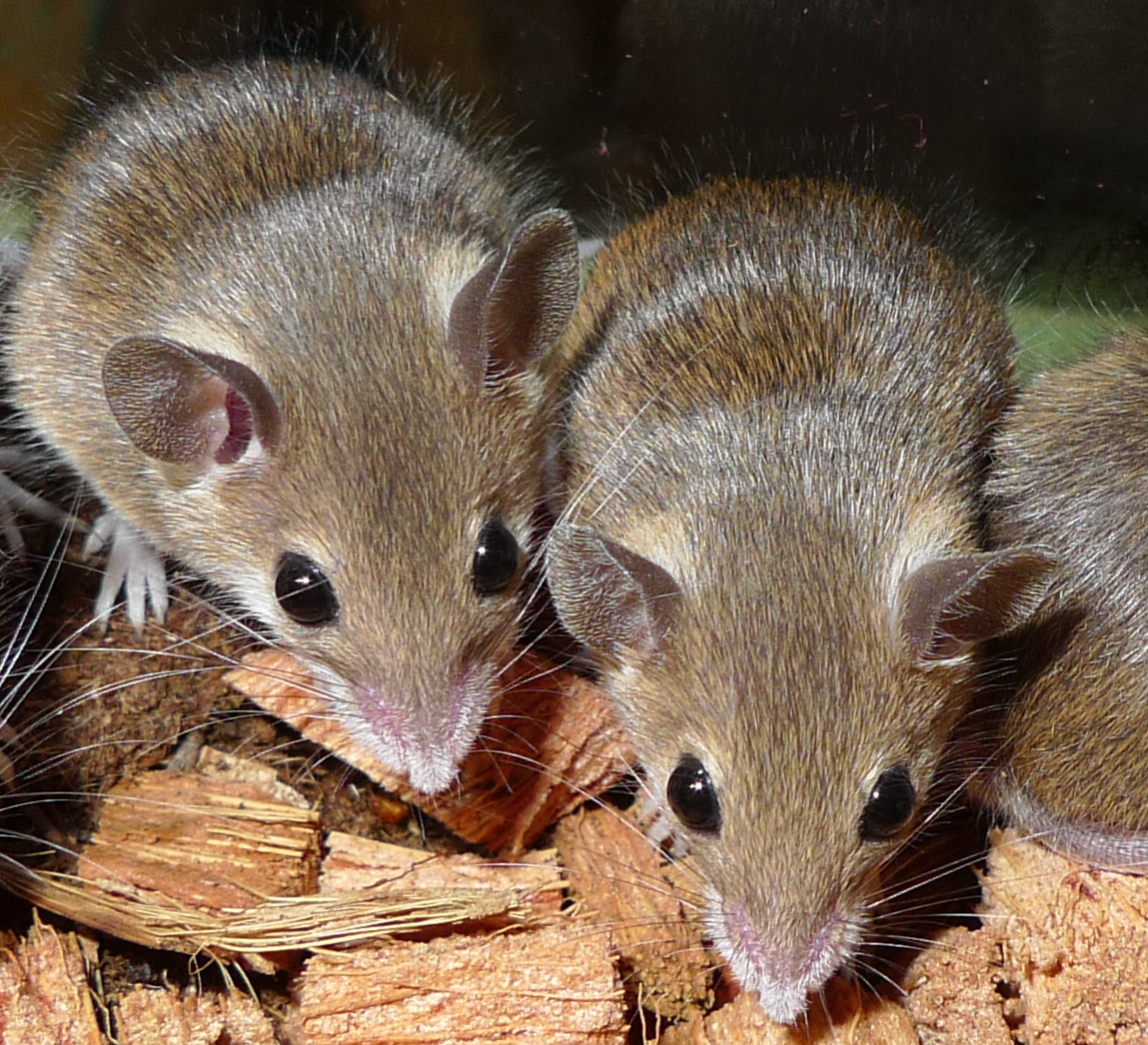
- Matthey's mouse (Mus mattheyi)

Scientific classification
- Kingdom: Animalia
- Phylum: Chordata
- Class: Mammalia
- Order: Rodentia
- Family: Muridae
- Genus: Mus
- Subgenus: Nannomys; Peters, 1876

Species
- 20, see text

= Mus (Nannomys) =

Subgenus of rodents

Nannomys is a subgenus of the rodent genus Mus, the mice. They are known as the African pygmy mice. These species are native to sub-Saharan Africa, where they can be found in many types of habitat. There are 20 species.

Species include:

- Baoule's mouse, Mus baoulei (Ivory Coast to Guinea)
- Toad mouse, Mus bufo (Mountains of Uganda, Rwanda, Burundi and neighboring parts of the Democratic Republic of Congo)
- Callewaert's mouse, Mus callewaerti (Angola and Democratic Republic of Congo)
- Gounda mouse, Mus goundae (Central African Republic)
- Hausa mouse, Mus haussa (Senegal to northern Nigeria)
- Ethiopian striped mouse, Mus imberbis (Ethiopia) (formerly classified in its own genus, Muriculus)
- Desert pygmy mouse, Mus indutus (Southern Angola to western Zimbabwe and northern South Africa)
- Mahomet mouse, Mus mahomet (Ethiopia, southwestern Uganda and southwestern Kenya)
- Matthey's mouse, Mus mattheyi (Ghana)
- African pygmy mouse, Mus minutoides (Zimbabwe, Southern Mozambique, South Africa)
- Harenna mouse, Mus harennensis (southern Ethiopia)
- Temminck's mouse, Mus musculoides (Africa south of the Sahara, excluding the range of Mus minutoides)
- Neave's mouse, Mus neavei (Eastern Democratic Republic of Congo to northeastern South Africa)
- Free State pygmy mouse, Mus orangiae (South Africa)
- Oubangui mouse, Mus oubanguii (Central African Republic)
- Peters's mouse, Mus setulosus (Senegal to Ethiopia and western Kenya)
- Setzer's pygmy mouse, Mus setzeri (Northeastern Namibia, Botswana, and western Zambia)
- Thomas's pygmy mouse, Mus sorella (Eastern Cameroon to western Tanzania)
- Delicate mouse, Mus tenellus (Sudan to southern Somalia and central Tanzania)
- Gray-bellied pygmy mouse, Mus triton (Southern Ethiopia to central Angola and Malawi)
