= Free State pygmy mouse =

Conservation status
- Least Concern (IUCN 3.1)

Scientific classification
- Kingdom: Animalia
- Phylum: Chordata
- Class: Mammalia
- Order: Rodentia
- Family: Muridae
- Genus: Mus
- Subgenus: Nannomys
- Species: M. orangiae

Binomial name
- Mus orangiae (Roberts, 1926)

Species of rodent

The Free State pygmy mouse or Orange mouse (Mus orangiae) is a species of rodent in the family Muridae. It is found in Lesotho and South Africa. Its natural habitats are subtropical or tropical high-altitude grassland, arable land, and pastureland.
