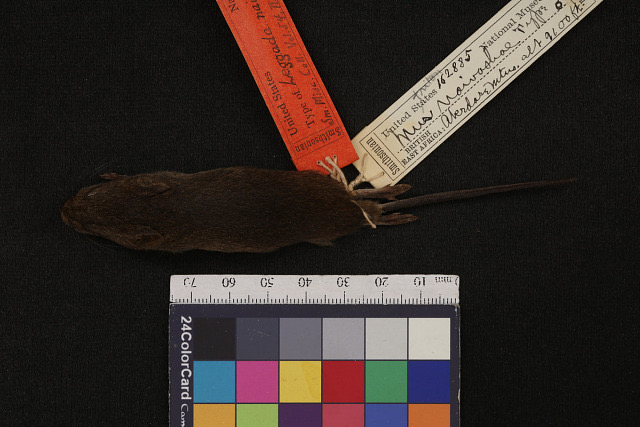

Conservation status
- Least Concern (IUCN 3.1)

Scientific classification
- Kingdom: Animalia
- Phylum: Chordata
- Class: Mammalia
- Infraclass: Placentalia
- Order: Rodentia
- Family: Muridae
- Genus: Mus
- Subgenus: Nannomys
- Species: M. triton

Binomial name
- Mus triton (Thomas, 1909)

= Gray-bellied pygmy mouse =

Species of rodent

The gray-bellied pygmy mouse (Mus triton) is a species of rodent in the family Muridae. It is found in Angola, Burundi, Democratic Republic of the Congo, Kenya, Malawi, Mozambique, Rwanda, Tanzania, Uganda, and Zambia. Its natural habitats are subtropical or tropical moist montane forests, subtropical or tropical seasonally wet or flooded lowland grassland, subtropical or tropical high-altitude grassland, and arable land.
