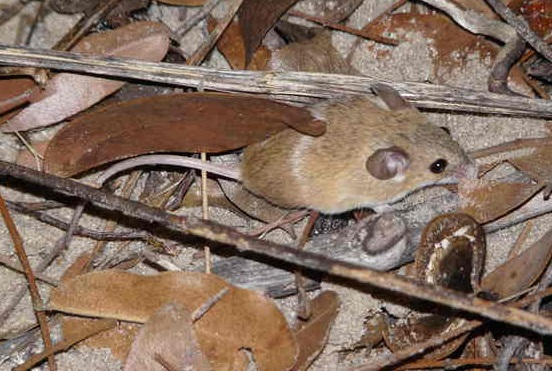

Conservation status
- Least Concern (IUCN 3.1)

Scientific classification
- Kingdom: Animalia
- Phylum: Chordata
- Class: Mammalia
- Infraclass: Placentalia
- Order: Rodentia
- Family: Muridae
- Genus: Mus
- Subgenus: Nannomys
- Species: M. indutus

Binomial name
- Mus indutus (Thomas, 1910)

= Desert pygmy mouse =

Species of rodent

The desert pygmy mouse (Mus indutus) is a species of rodent in the family Muridae. It is found in Angola, Botswana, Namibia, South Africa, Zambia, and Zimbabwe. Its natural habitats are dry savanna and subtropical or tropical high-altitude grassland.

== Behaviour ==
The desert pygmy mouse is territorial, but it can be found singularly, in pairs or in groups. It is nocturnal. Its diet consists of grass and other seeds, as well as insects.

For Desert pygmy mice in captivity some cases of cannibalism were observed.
