= Ethiopian striped mouse =

Conservation status
- Least Concern (IUCN 3.1)

Scientific classification
- Kingdom: Animalia
- Phylum: Chordata
- Class: Mammalia
- Order: Rodentia
- Family: Muridae
- Genus: Mus
- Species: M. imberbis

Binomial name
- Mus imberbis Rüppell, 1842

Synonyms
- Muriculus imberbis (Rüppell, 1842)

Species of rodent

The Ethiopian striped mouse or striped-back mouse (Mus imberbis) is a species of rodent in the family Muridae. It is only found in Ethiopia. It was formerly classified in the monotypic genus Muriculus, but phylogenetic evidence supports Muriculus being a subgenus within Mus, the true mice. The Ethiopian striped mouse's natural habitats are subtropical or tropical high-altitude grassland and urban areas. It is threatened by habitat loss.
