= Thomas's pygmy mouse =

Conservation status
- Least Concern (IUCN 3.1)

Scientific classification
- Kingdom: Animalia
- Phylum: Chordata
- Class: Mammalia
- Order: Rodentia
- Family: Muridae
- Genus: Mus
- Subgenus: Nannomys
- Species: M. sorella

Binomial name
- Mus sorella (Thomas, 1909)

Species of rodent

The Thomas's pygmy mouse (Mus sorella) is a species of rodent in the family Muridae. It is found in Angola, Cameroon, Republic of the Congo, Democratic Republic of the Congo, Gabon, Kenya, Rwanda, South Sudan, Tanzania, and Uganda. Its natural habitats are subtropical or tropical moist lowland forest, subtropical or tropical moist montane forest, and dry savanna.
