= Setzer's pygmy mouse =

Conservation status
- Least Concern (IUCN 3.1)

Scientific classification
- Kingdom: Animalia
- Phylum: Chordata
- Class: Mammalia
- Infraclass: Placentalia
- Order: Rodentia
- Family: Muridae
- Genus: Mus
- Subgenus: Nannomys
- Species: M. setzeri

Binomial name
- Mus setzeri Petter, 1978

Species of rodent

Setzer's pygmy mouse (Mus setzeri) is a species of rodent in the family Muridae. It is found in Botswana, Namibia, and Zambia. Its natural habitats are dry savanna, rivers, freshwater lakes, and intermittent freshwater lakes.
