= Nigerian shrew =

Conservation status
- Least Concern (IUCN 3.1)

Scientific classification
- Kingdom: Animalia
- Phylum: Chordata
- Class: Mammalia
- Order: Eulipotyphla
- Family: Soricidae
- Genus: Crocidura
- Species: C. nigeriae

Binomial name
- Crocidura nigeriae Dollman, 1915
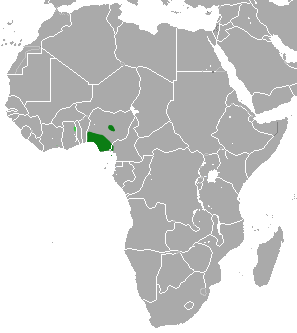
- Nigerian shrew range

Species of mammal

The Nigerian shrew (Crocidura nigeriae) is a species of mammal in the family Soricidae. The animal is found in Benin, Burkina Faso, Cameroon, Ivory Coast, Nigeria, Togo, and there are claims of it also being found in Ghana. Its natural habitat is subtropical or tropical moist lowland forests.

Together with its counterpart the Crocidura poensis or Fraser's Musk Shrew, it is known as Asín in Yoruba and Nkapi or Nkakwu in Igbo.

Like many other types of shrew, it emits a foul and lingering odour from its musk glands which immediately alerts as to its presence.

With its long, flexible snouts, the Nigerian shrew (Crocidura nigeriae) is a swift, and relatively large shrew. They are among the only mammals that use echolocation. They are a burrowing animal. Breeding activity is greatest during rainy seasons; the Nigerian shrew is found in lowland tropical moist forests in Nigeria, Cameroon, and Bioko Island.
