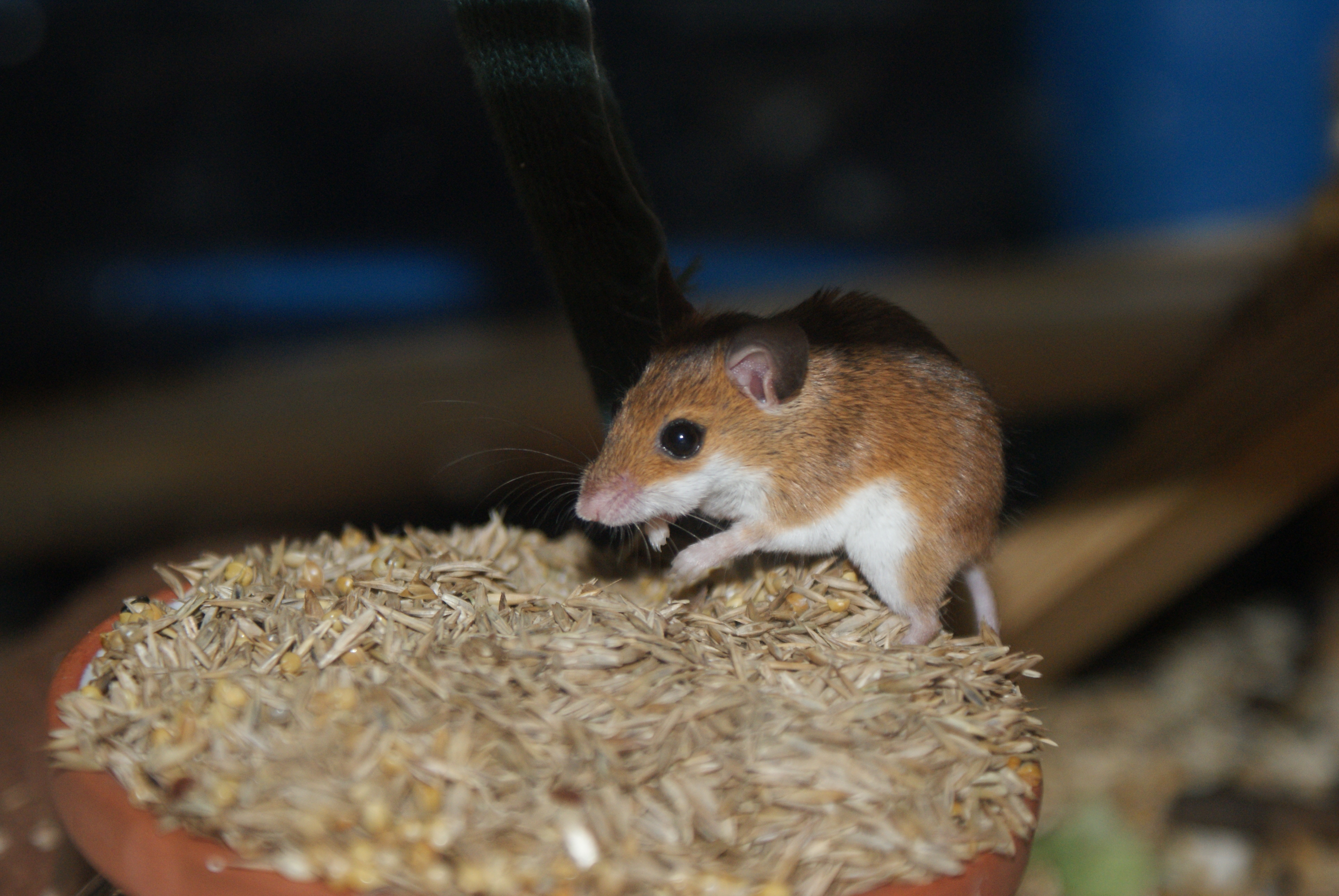

Conservation status
- Least Concern (IUCN 3.1)

Scientific classification
- Kingdom: Animalia
- Phylum: Chordata
- Class: Mammalia
- Order: Rodentia
- Family: Muridae
- Genus: Mus
- Subgenus: Nannomys
- Species: M. musculoides

Binomial name
- Mus musculoides (Temminck, 1853)

Synonyms
- Mus bella Mus bellus enclavae Mus enclavae Mus enclavae Heller, 1911; Mus musculoides enclavae Nannomys musculoides

= Temminck's mouse =

Species of rodent

Temminck's mouse (Mus musculoides) is a species of the genus Mus and of the subgenus Nannomys. It is found throughout West Africa, Central Africa, and East Africa.
