= Bicolored musk shrew =

Conservation status
- Least Concern (IUCN 3.1)

Scientific classification
- Kingdom: Animalia
- Phylum: Chordata
- Class: Mammalia
- Order: Eulipotyphla
- Family: Soricidae
- Genus: Crocidura
- Species: C. fuscomurina

Binomial name
- Crocidura fuscomurina (Heuglin, 1865)
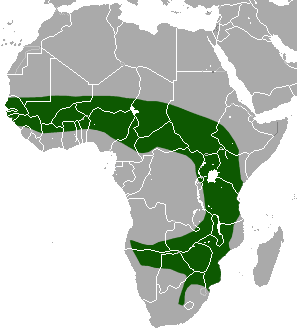
- Bicolored musk shrew range

Species of mammal

The bicolored musk shrew (Crocidura fuscomurina) is a species of mammal in the family Soricidae.

It can be found in Angola, Benin, Botswana, Burkina Faso, Burundi, Cameroon, Central African Republic, Chad, Democratic Republic of the Congo, Ivory Coast, Ethiopia, Gambia, Ghana, Guinea, Guinea-Bissau, Kenya, Lesotho, Malawi, Mali, Mauritania, Mozambique, Namibia, Niger, Nigeria, Rwanda, Senegal, Sierra Leone, South Africa, Sudan, Tanzania, Togo, Uganda, Zambia, and Zimbabwe. Its natural habitats are savanna, subtropical or tropical dry lowland grassland, and hot deserts.
