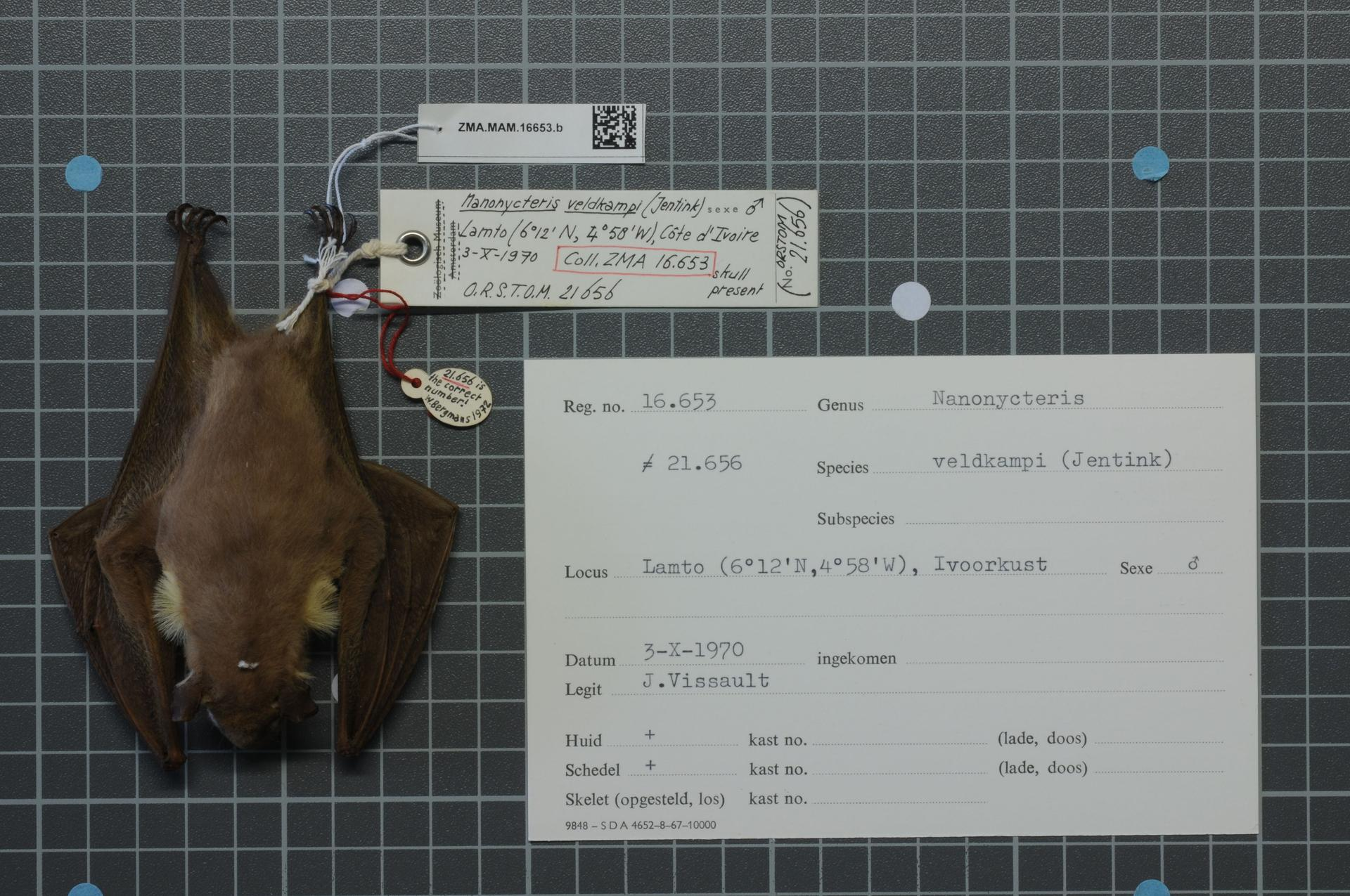

Conservation status
- Least Concern (IUCN 3.1)

Scientific classification
- Kingdom: Animalia
- Phylum: Chordata
- Class: Mammalia
- Order: Chiroptera
- Family: Pteropodidae
- Genus: Nanonycteris; Matschie, 1899
- Species: N. veldkampii

Binomial name
- Nanonycteris veldkampii (Jentink, 1888)
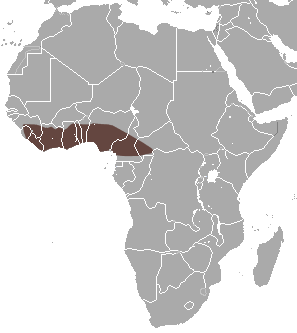
- Veldkamp's dwarf epauletted fruit bat range

= Veldkamp's dwarf epauletted fruit bat =

Species of bat

Veldkamp's dwarf epauletted fruit bat (Nanonycteris veldkampii) is a species of bat in the family Pteropodidae. It is the only species within the genus Nanonycteris. It is found in Benin, Cameroon, Central African Republic, Ivory Coast, Ghana, Guinea, Liberia, Nigeria, Sierra Leone, and Togo. Its natural habitats are subtropical or tropical moist, mangrove and montane forests, and savanna.

== Ecology ==
It seems to be relatively adaptable to cultivated areas, with animals recorded from tree plantations, botanic gardens, farm areas, and rural gardens. The species shows some migratory patterns with both sexes moving between forest and savanna habitats. The generation length is about 4.25 years. It is migratory, with both sexes moving between forest and savanna habitats. It is generally a lowland species, but has been recorded up to 1,200 m asl.

They feed on flowers as well as fruit. When feeding, the bats may clasp the ball of flowers, lapping nectar from the circular depression.
