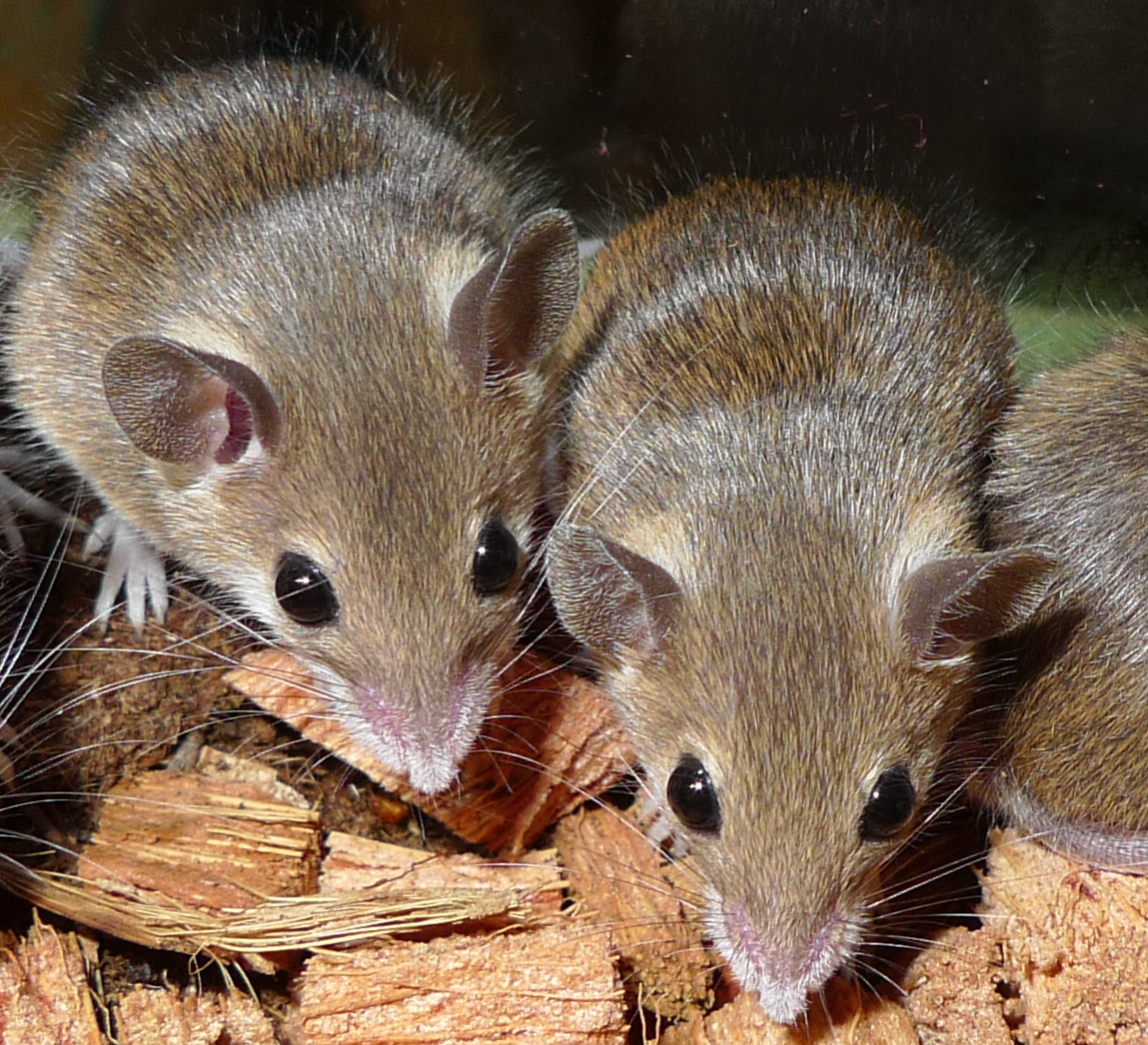

Conservation status
- Least Concern (IUCN 3.1)

Scientific classification
- Kingdom: Animalia
- Phylum: Chordata
- Class: Mammalia
- Infraclass: Placentalia
- Order: Rodentia
- Family: Muridae
- Genus: Mus
- Subgenus: Nannomys
- Species: M. mattheyi

Binomial name
- Mus mattheyi Petter, 1969

= Matthey's mouse =

Species of rodent

Matthey's mouse (Mus mattheyi) is a species of rodent in the family Muridae. Matthey's mouse was first described by Francis Petter (1923–2012) in 1969 and was named after Robert Matthey (1900–1982).

It is found in Burkina Faso, Ivory Coast, Ghana, Mali, Senegal, Togo, and possibly also in Benin, Guinea, and Guinea-Bissau.

Its natural habitat is moist savanna.
