= Hausa mouse =

Conservation status
- Least Concern (IUCN 3.1)

Scientific classification
- Kingdom: Animalia
- Phylum: Chordata
- Class: Mammalia
- Infraclass: Placentalia
- Order: Rodentia
- Family: Muridae
- Genus: Mus
- Subgenus: Nannomys
- Species: M. haussa

Binomial name
- Mus haussa (Thomas & Hinton, 1920)

Species of rodent

The Hausa mouse (Mus haussa) is a species of rodent in the family Muridae. It is found in Benin, Burkina Faso, Ivory Coast, Ghana, Mali, Mauritania, Niger, Nigeria, and Senegal. Its natural habitats are dry savanna, arable land, rural gardens, and urban areas.
