= Baoule's mouse =

Conservation status
- Least Concern (IUCN 3.1)

Scientific classification
- Kingdom: Animalia
- Phylum: Chordata
- Class: Mammalia
- Order: Rodentia
- Family: Muridae
- Genus: Mus
- Subgenus: Nannomys
- Species: M. baoulei

Binomial name
- Mus baoulei (Vermeiren & Verheyen, 1980)

Species of rodent

Baoule's mouse (Mus baoulei) is a species of rodent in the family Muridae. It is found in Benin, Ivory Coast, Guinea, possibly Ghana, and possibly Sierra Leone. Its natural habitat is dry savanna.
