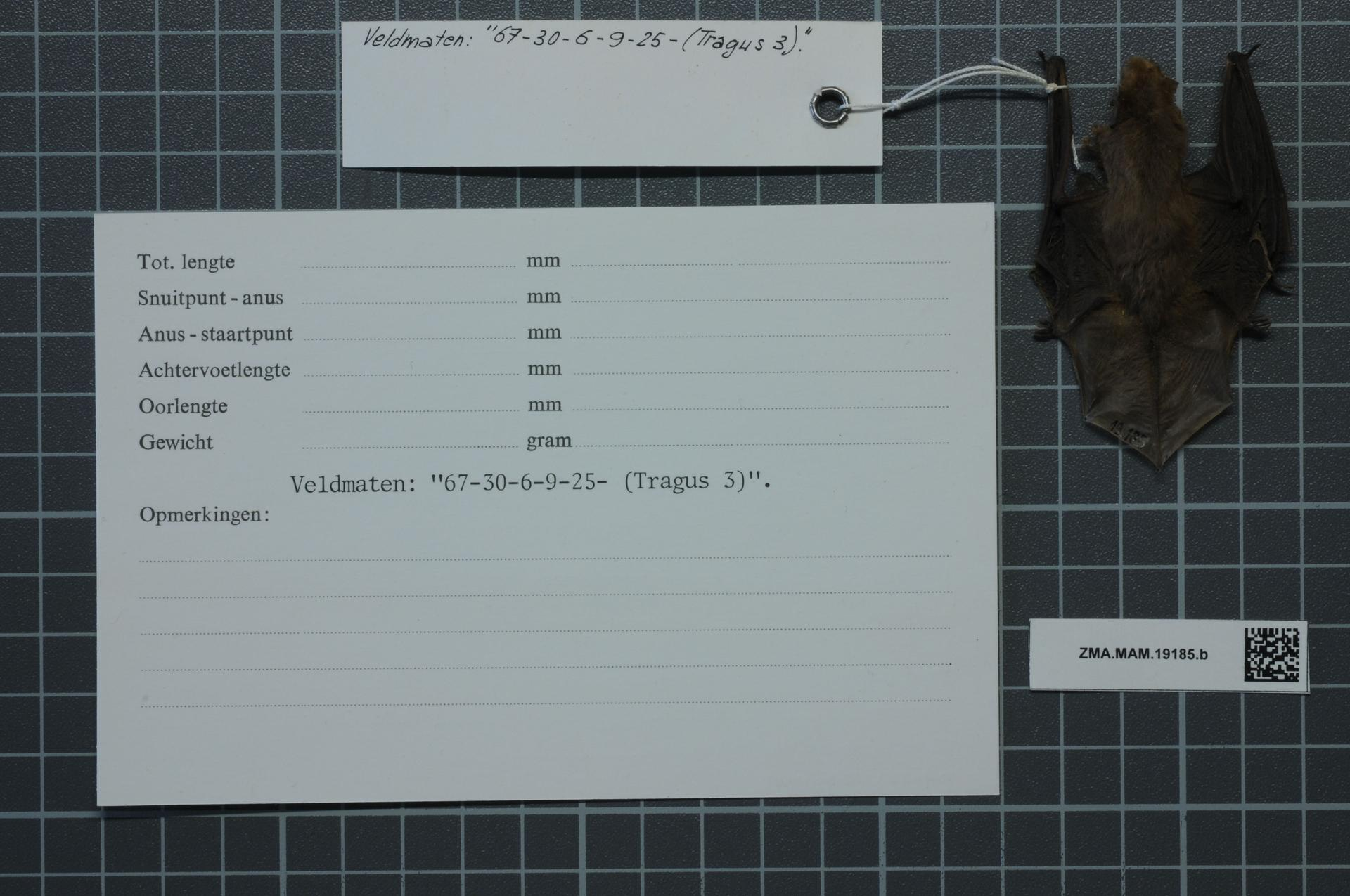

Conservation status
- Least Concern (IUCN 3.1)

Scientific classification
- Kingdom: Animalia
- Phylum: Chordata
- Class: Mammalia
- Order: Chiroptera
- Family: Vespertilionidae
- Genus: Neoromicia
- Species: N. guineensis

Binomial name
- Neoromicia guineensis (Bocage, 1889)

Synonyms
- Eptesicus guineensis (Bocage, 1889)

= Tiny serotine =

Species of bat

The tiny serotine (Neoromicia guineensis) is a species of vesper bat. It is found in Benin, Burkina Faso, Cameroon, Central African Republic, Chad, Republic of the Congo, Democratic Republic of the Congo, Ivory Coast, Ethiopia, Gambia, Ghana, Guinea, Guinea-Bissau, Nigeria, Senegal, Sudan, Togo, and Uganda. Its natural habitats are savanna and subtropical or tropical shrubland.
