= Peters's mouse =

Peters' mouse

Conservation status
- Least Concern (IUCN 3.1)

Scientific classification
- Kingdom: Animalia
- Phylum: Chordata
- Class: Mammalia
- Infraclass: Placentalia
- Order: Rodentia
- Family: Muridae
- Genus: Mus
- Subgenus: Nannomys
- Species: M. setulosus

Binomial name
- Mus setulosus Peters, 1876

Species of rodent

Peters's mouse (Mus setulosus) is a species of rodent in the family Muridae. It is found in Benin, Cameroon, Central African Republic, Republic of the Congo, Democratic Republic of the Congo, Ivory Coast, Equatorial Guinea, Ethiopia, Gabon, Ghana, Guinea, Kenya, Liberia, Nigeria, Sierra Leone, Togo, and Uganda. Its natural habitats are subtropical or tropical dry forests and dry savanna.
