= Fox's shrew =

Conservation status
- Least Concern (IUCN 3.1)

Scientific classification
- Kingdom: Animalia
- Phylum: Chordata
- Class: Mammalia
- Order: Eulipotyphla
- Family: Soricidae
- Genus: Crocidura
- Species: C. foxi

Binomial name
- Crocidura foxi Dollman, 1915
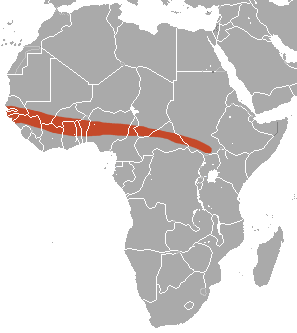
- Fox's shrew range

Species of mammal

Fox's shrew (Crocidura foxi) is a species of mammal in the family Soricidae. It is found in Benin, Burkina Faso, Cameroon, Central African Republic, Chad, Ivory Coast, Gambia, Ghana, Guinea, Guinea-Bissau, Mali, Nigeria, Senegal, South Sudan, and Togo. Its natural habitats are subtropical or tropical moist lowland forest, moist savanna, and plantations.
