= Lamotte's shrew =

Conservation status
- Least Concern (IUCN 3.1)

Scientific classification
- Kingdom: Animalia
- Phylum: Chordata
- Class: Mammalia
- Order: Eulipotyphla
- Family: Soricidae
- Genus: Crocidura
- Species: C. lamottei

Binomial name
- Crocidura lamottei Heim de Balsac, 1968
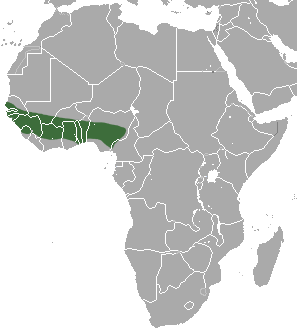
- Lamotte's shrew range

Species of mammal

Lamotte's shrew (Crocidura lamottei) is a species of mammal in the family Soricidae. It is found in Benin, Burkina Faso, Cameroon, Ivory Coast, Gambia, Ghana, Guinea, Guinea-Bissau, Liberia, Mali, Nigeria, Senegal, Sierra Leone, and Togo. Its natural habitat is primarily savanna, though it may also be found in mixed forest and savanna.

Lamotte's shrew was first described by Heim de Balsac in 1968. It is listed as a species of Least Concern by the IUCN due to its wide range.
