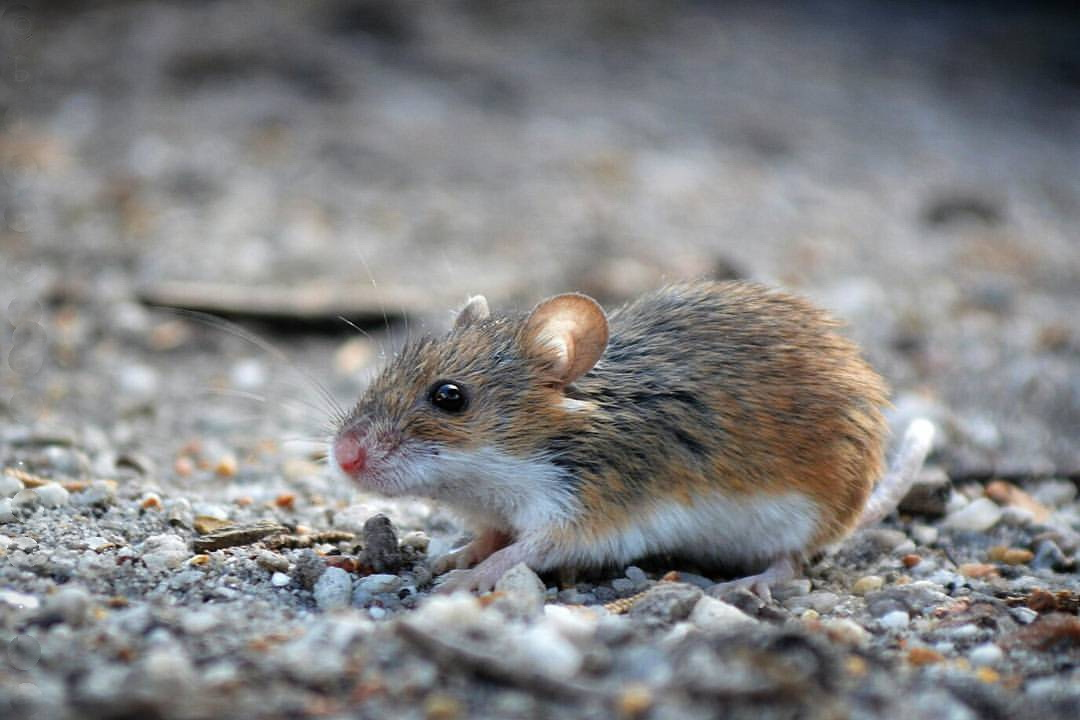
- Photographed in Western Cape

Conservation status
- Least Concern (IUCN 3.1)

Scientific classification
- Kingdom: Animalia
- Phylum: Chordata
- Class: Mammalia
- Order: Rodentia
- Family: Muridae
- Genus: Mus
- Subgenus: Nannomys
- Species: M. minutoides

Binomial name
- Mus minutoides (A Smith, 1834)

Synonyms
- Mus kasaicus (Cabrera, 1924)

= African pygmy mouse =

Species of rodent

The African pygmy mouse (Mus minutoides) is one of the smallest rodents. It is widespread within sub-Saharan Africa, and is kept as a pet in other parts of the world. Like the common and widely introduced European house mouse, it is a member of the enormous superfamily Muroidea, which includes over 1000 different species. It forms a super- species complex with Mus musculoides.

Grey to brick-red overall, it is pale on the underside and has small but prominent triangular ears. Adult body length averages 50 mm (2.0 in) long, with a 40 mm (1.6 in) tail. Average adults body weight is 5 g (0.18 oz).

The African pygmy mouse reaches breeding age at about 6 to 8 weeks. Pregnancy lasts for around 20 days and the litter of about three young is born blind and hairless. Average weight of puppies at birth is 0.8 g (0.028 oz) Their eyes open after 2 weeks, and weaning is complete after 3 weeks. The lifespan is about 2 years, although individual specimens have been reported to live over 4 years in captivity.

The African pygmy mouse has a number of unique traits. It stacks pebbles in front of its burrow. Overnight, the pebbles gather dew and in the morning, the pygmy mouse drinks the dew on the pebbles. After that, it retires to its den. Its method of sex determination has also been found to differ from most mammals in that rearrangements of the X chromosome have led to many XY individuals actually being female.

The species lives in colonies or in pairs in grass close to water and is an excellent climber.

== As pets ==
Pygmy mice are often kept as pets, but require social interaction, so should always be kept as pairs or small colonies. They have quite simple care needs, and are active during both day and night, but cannot be handled due to the risk of inadvertently causing internal damage due to their small size and tendency to jump when startled. Despite their size, they can jump up to 50 cm (20 in). Domestically, they are often kept in a covered aquarium so that they do not escape.
