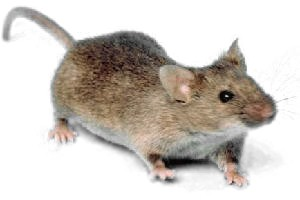
- House mouse (Mus musculus)

Scientific classification
- Kingdom: Animalia
- Phylum: Chordata
- Class: Mammalia
- Infraclass: Placentalia
- Order: Rodentia
- Family: Muridae
- Subfamily: Murinae
- Tribe: Murini; Winge, 1887
- Genus: Mus; Linnaeus, 1758

Type species
- Mus musculus Linnaeus, 1758

Subgenera
- Coelomys; Mus; Muriculus; Nannomys; Pyromys; †Malpaisomys

= Mus (genus) =

Mus Temporal range: Middle Miocene - Recent, 15–0 Ma

Genus of rodents

The genus Mus or typical mice refers to a specific genus of muroid rodents, all typically called mice (the adjective "muroid" comes from the word "Muroidea", which is a large superfamily of rodents, including mice, rats, voles, hamsters, gerbils, and many other relatives), though the term can be used for other rodents. They are the only members of the tribe Murini.

== Subgenera, species, and subspecies ==
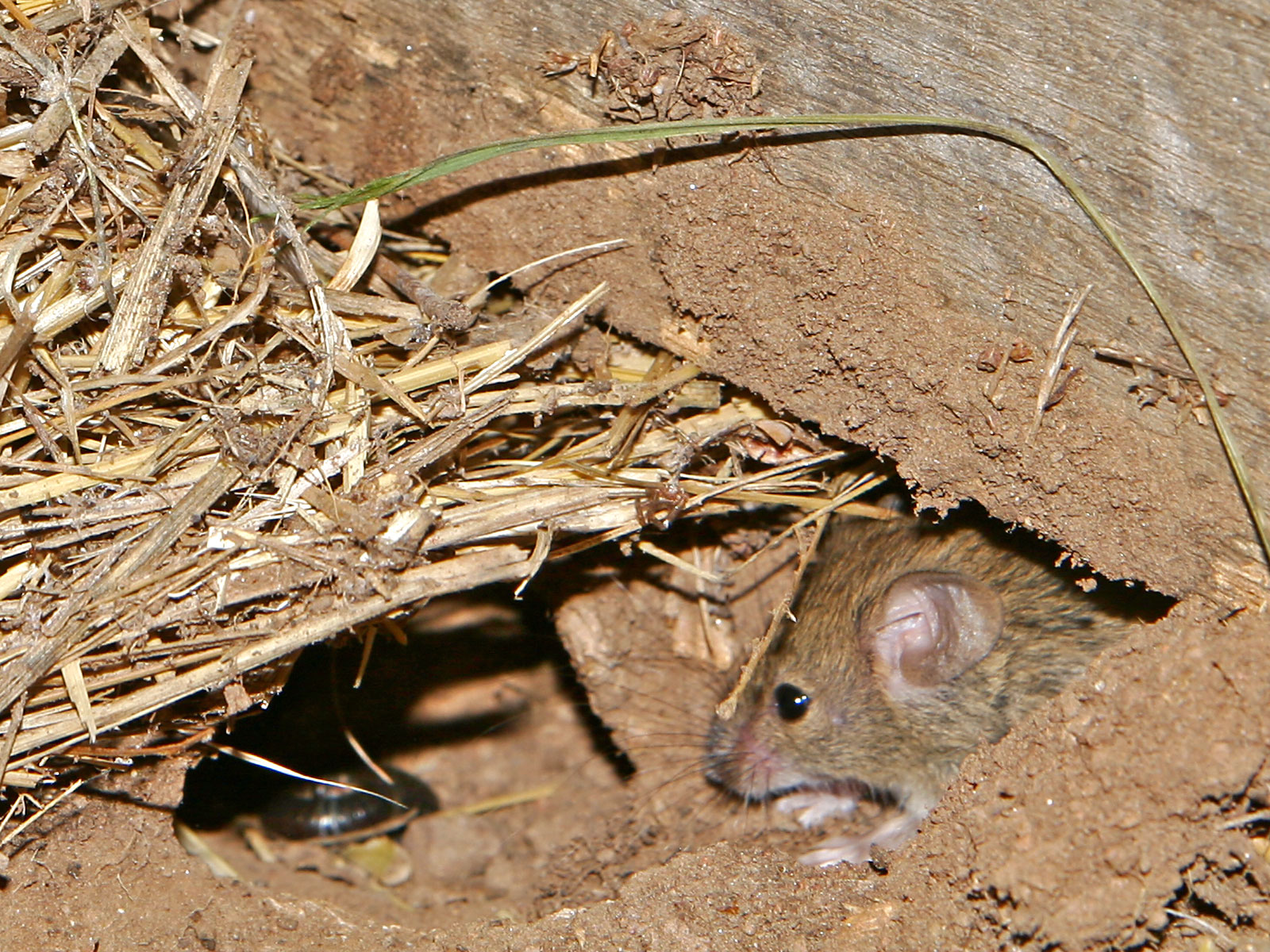
Mouse of the subgenus Mus

The following is a list of Mus subgenera, species, and subspecies:

- Coelomys
  - Mus crociduroides (Sumatran shrew-like mouse)
  - Mus mayori (Mayor's mouse)
  - Mus pahari (Gairdner's shrewmouse)
  - Mus vulcani (volcano mouse)
- Mus
  - Mus booduga (little Indian field mouse)
  - Mus caroli (Ryukyu mouse)
  - Mus cervicolor (fawn-colored mouse)
    - Mus cervicolor cervicolor
    - Mus cervicolor popaeus
  - Mus cookii (Cook's mouse)
  - Mus cypriacus (Cyprus mouse)
  - Mus famulus (servant mouse)
  - Mus fragilicauda (sheath-tailed mouse)
  - Mus lepidoides (little Burmese field mouse)
  - Mus macedonicus (Macedonian mouse)
    - Mus macedonicus macedonicus
    - Mus macedonicus spretoides
  - Mus musculus (house mouse)
    - Mus musculus albula
    - Mus musculus bactrianus (Southwest Asian house mouse)
    - Mus musculus brevirostris
    - Mus musculus castaneus (Southeast Asian house mouse)
    - Mus musculus domesticus (Western European house mouse)
    - Mus musculus gansuensis
    - Mus musculus gentilulus (pygmy house mouse)
    - Mus musculus helgolandicus
    - Mus musculus homourus
    - Mus musculus isatissus
    - Mus musculus molossinus (Japanese house mouse)
    - Mus musculus musculus (Eastern European house mouse)
    - Mus musculus wagneri
  - Mus nitidulus (Blyth's mouse)
  - Mus spicilegus (steppe mouse)
  - Mus spretus (western wild mouse)
  - Mus terricolor (earth-colored mouse)
  - Mus triton (gray-bellied mouse)
  - †Mus minotaurus (Cretan mouse) (extinct, Holocene)
- Muriculus
  - Mus imberbis (Ethiopian striped mouse)
- Nannomys
  - Mus baoulei (Baoule's mouse)
  - Mus bufo (toad mouse)
  - Mus callewaerti (Callewaert's mouse)
  - Mus goundae (Gounda mouse)
  - Mus haussa (Hausa mouse)
  - Mus indutus (desert pygmy mouse)
  - Mus mahomet (Mahomet mouse)
  - Mus mattheyi (Matthey's mouse)
  - Mus minutoides (Southern African pygmy mouse)
  - Mus musculoides (Temminck's mouse)
  - Mus neavei (Neave's mouse)
  - Mus oubanguii (Ubangui mouse)
  - Mus setulosus (Peters's mouse)
  - Mus setzeri (Setzer's mouse)
  - Mus sorella (Thomas's pygmy mouse)
  - Mus tenellus (delicate mouse)
- Pyromys
  - Mus dumbara (Dumbara valley spiny mouse)
  - Mus fernandoni (Ceylon spiny mouse)
  - Mus phillipsi (Phillips's mouse)
  - Mus platythrix (flat-haired mouse)
  - Mus saxicola (spiny mouse)
  - Mus shortridgei (Shortridge's mouse)

== Mice and human health ==
Mice are part of human experimentation. Many of the tests are related to new products that are launched on the market, but they are also required to try new medicines for the cure of chronic and deadly human diseases.

After the outbreak of H5N1 influenza in China in 2006, US scientists discovered that under training, mice could detect carrier birds with this virus, so they would prevent a massive contagion or threat of an epidemic.
