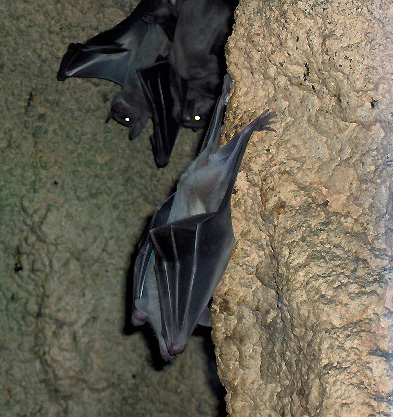
- Rousettus egyptiacus in a roost.

Scientific classification
- Domain: Eukaryota
- Kingdom: Animalia
- Phylum: Chordata
- Class: Mammalia
- Order: Chiroptera
- Family: Pteropodidae
- Subfamily: Rousettinae; Anderson, 1912

Genera
- See text

= Rousettinae =

Subfamily of bats

The Rousettinae are a subfamily of megabats. Taxa within this subfamily include:

- Tribe Eonycterini
  - Genus Eonycteris
    - Greater nectar bat, E. major
    - Cave nectar bat, E. spelaea
    - Philippine dawn bat, E. robusta
- tribe Epomophorini
  - Genus Epomophorus
    - Angolan epauletted fruit bat, E. angolensis
    - Ansell's epauletted fruit bat, E. anselli
    - Peters's epauletted fruit bat, E. crypturus
    - Dobson's epauletted fruit bat, E. dobsonii
    - Gambian epauletted fruit bat, E. gambianus
    - Lesser Angolan epauletted fruit bat, E. grandis
    - Ethiopian epauletted fruit bat, E. labiatus
    - East African epauletted fruit bat, E. minimus
    - Minor epauletted fruit bat, E. minor
    - Wahlberg's epauletted fruit bat, E. wahlbergi
  - Genus Epomops
    - Buettikofer's epauletted fruit bat, E. buettikoferi
    - Franquet's epauletted fruit bat, E. franqueti
  - Genus Hypsignathus
    - Hammer-headed bat, H. monstrosus
  - Genus Micropteropus
    - Hayman's dwarf epauletted fruit bat, M. intermedius
    - Peters's dwarf epauletted fruit bat, M. pusillus
  - Genus Nanonycteris
    - Veldkamp's dwarf epauletted fruit bat, N. veldkampii
- tribe Myonycterini
  - Genus Megaloglossus
    - Azagnyi fruit bat, M. azagnyi
    - Woermann's bat, M. woermanni
  - Genus Myonycteris
    - São Tomé collared fruit bat, M. brachycephala
    - East African little collared fruit bat, M. relicta
    - Little collared fruit bat, M. torquata
- Tribe Plerotini
  - Genus Plerotes
    - D'Anchieta's fruit bat, P. anchietae
- Tribe Rousettini
  - Genus Rousettus – rousette fruit bats
    - Genus Rousettus
      - Manado fruit bat, R. bidens
      - Geoffrey's rousette, R. amplexicaudatus
      - Egyptian rousette, R. aegyptiacus
      - Leschenault's rousette, R. leschenaulti
      - Linduan rousette, R. linduensis
      - Comoro rousette, R. obliviosis
      - Bare-backed rousette, R. spinalatus
      - Madagascan rousette, R. madagascariensis
- Tribe incertae sedis
  - Genus Pilonycteris
    - Sulawesi rousette, P. celebensis
- Tribe Scotonycterini
  - Genus Casinycteris
    - Short-palated fruit bat, C. argynnis
    - Campo-Ma’an fruit bat, C. campomaanensis
    - Pohle's fruit bat, C. ophiodon
  - Genus Scotonycteris
    - Zenker's fruit bat, S. zenkeri
- Tribe Stenonycterini
  - Genus Stenonycteris
    - Long-haired fruit bat, S. lanosis
