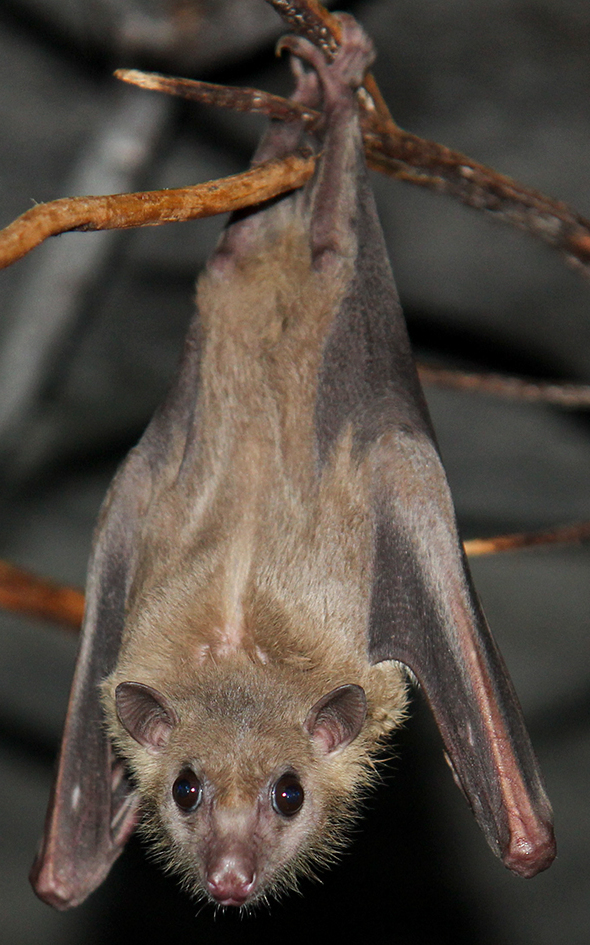

Conservation status
- Least Concern (IUCN 3.1)

Scientific classification
- Kingdom: Animalia
- Phylum: Chordata
- Class: Mammalia
- Order: Chiroptera
- Family: Pteropodidae
- Genus: Rousettus
- Species: R. aegyptiacus

Binomial name
- Rousettus aegyptiacus (Geoffroy, 1810)
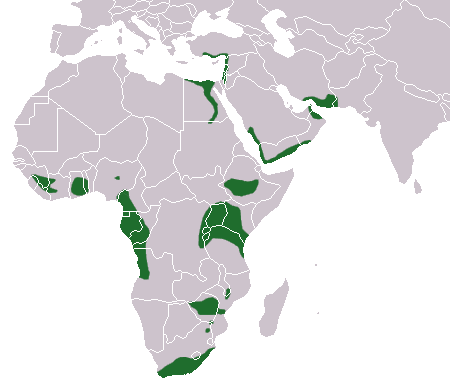
- Egyptian fruit bat range

Synonyms
- List: Pteropus egyptiacus Geoffroy, 1810; Pteropus aegyptiacus (Geoffroy, 1810); Pteropus collaris (Lichtenstein, 1823); Pteropus geoffroyi (Temminck, 1825); Pteropus hottentotus (Temminck, 1832); Eleutherura ægyptiaca(Gray, 1870); Eleutherura unicolor (Gray, 1870); Rousettus unicolor (Gray, 1870); Pteropus leachii (Smith, 1892); Rousettus arabicus (Anderson and de Winton, 1902); Rousettus sjostedti (Lönnbert, 1908); Rousettus occidentalis (Eisentraut, 1960); Rousettus princeps (Juste and Ibañez, 1993); Rousettus thomensis (Feiler, Haft, and Widmann, 1993); Rousettus tomensis (Juste and Ibañez), 1993)

= Egyptian fruit bat =

Species of bat

The Egyptian fruit bat or Egyptian rousette (Rousettus aegyptiacus) is a species of megabat that occurs in Africa, the Middle East, the Mediterranean and the Indian subcontinent. It is one of three species of Rousettus with an African-Malagasy range, though the only species of its genus found in continental Africa. The common ancestor of the three species colonised the region in the late Pliocene or early Pleistocene. The species is traditionally divided into six subspecies. It is considered a medium-sized megabat, with adults weighing 80–170 g (2.8–6.0 oz) and having a wingspan of approximately 60 cm (24 in). Individuals are dark brown or greyish brown, with their undersides paler than their backs.

The Egyptian fruit bat is a highly social species, usually living in colonies with thousands of other bats. It, along with other members of the genus Rousettus, are some of the only fruit bats to use echolocation, though a more primitive version than used by bats in other families. It has also developed a socially-complex vocal system to communicate with conspecifics. The Egyptian fruit bat is a frugivore that consumes a variety of fruit depending on the season and local availability. Because of its consumption of commercially-grown fruit, the Egyptian fruit bat is considered a pest by some farmers. It also acts as a pollinator and seed disperser for many species of trees and other plants.

== Taxonomy and etymology ==
- - Other pteropodid species
  - - - R. amplexicaudatus
    - - R. spinalatus
      - - R. leschenaultii
        - - R. aegyptiacus
          - - R. madagascariensis
            - R. obliviosus

Relationship of R. aegyptiacus within Pteropodidae (not all Rousettus species included) based on 2016 study of mitochondrial and nuclear DNA

The Egyptian fruit bat was described as a new species in 1810 by French naturalist Étienne Geoffroy Saint-Hilaire, who gave it the name Pteropus egyptiacus. He later revised the specific epithet to ægyptiacus, given as 1812 or 1818. In 1870, John Edward Gray placed it in the now-defunct genus Eleutherura, treating the taxon as two species (E. unicolor and E. ægyptiaca). Danish mammalogist Knud Andersen was the first reviser of the taxon; he used Rousettus ægyptiacus and wrote that egyptiacus "may [...] be considered a slip or misprint corrected by the author himself".

In 1992, G. B. Corbet and J. E. Hill argued that Geoffroy's revision from egyptiacus to ægyptiacus was invalid according to the ICZN Code, and changed the name back to egyptiacus. The 1999 Mammalian Species review used egyptiacus as well. However, Geoffroy's revision was supported in 2001 by D. Kock. He notes that aegyptiacus was "accepted almost universally by the scientific community", with emphasis on its use by Andersen in 1912. Kock argued that even if it was an unjustified emendation at first, it became a justified emendation through widespread use, as the use of aegyptiacus was undisputed until Corbet and Hill (the ICZN Code also mandates that the ligature "æ" become "ae" in scientific names, so ægyptiacus is no longer in use). Kock also writes that since the Latin adjective for "Egyptian" is aegyptiacus, egyptiacus is a simple misspelling in the original description. The Agreement on the Conservation of Populations of European Bats was amended to use the specific name aegyptiacus in 2003. Books like Mammal Species of the World (2005) and Mammals of Africa (2013) follow Kock and use the name aegyptiacus.

Two other members of Rousettus have an African-Malagasy range: the Madagascan rousette (R. madagascariensis) and the Comoro rousette (R. obliviosus). Based on an analysis of both mitochondrial and nuclear genetics, the Egyptian fruit bat forms a clade with the Madagascan and Comoro rousettes. The Rousettus lineage colonised Africa in a single event in the late Pliocene or early Pleistocene. Diversification into three species followed soon after, with the Egyptian fruit bat the first to branch; the Comoro and Madagascan rousettes have a more recent common ancestor with each other than with the Egyptian fruit bat.

=== Subspecies ===
There are six subspecies of Rousettus aegyptiacus.

Subspecies	Authority	Type Locality	Year
R. a. aegyptiacus	Étienne Geoffroy Saint-Hilaire	Giza, Egypt	1810
R. a. leachii	Andrew Smith	Cape Town, South Africa	1829
R. a. unicolor	John Edward Gray	Gabon	1870
R. a. arabicus	John Anderson and William Edward de Winton	Aden, Yemen	1902
R. a. princeps	Javier Juste and Carlos Ibañez	Príncipe, São Tomé and Príncipe	1993
R. a. tomensis	Javier Juste and Carlos Ibañez	São Tomé, São Tomé and Príncipe	1993

== Description ==
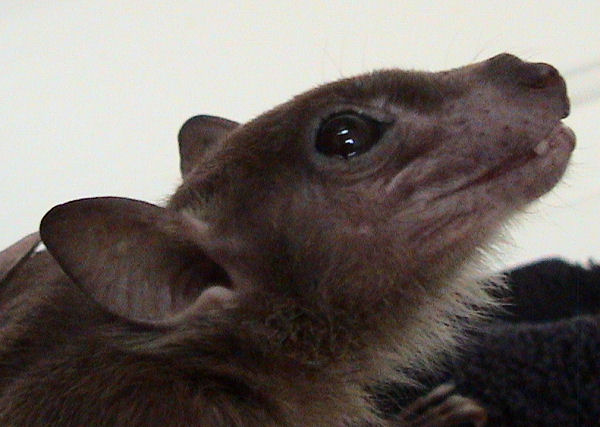
Closeup view of the Egyptian fruit bat's head

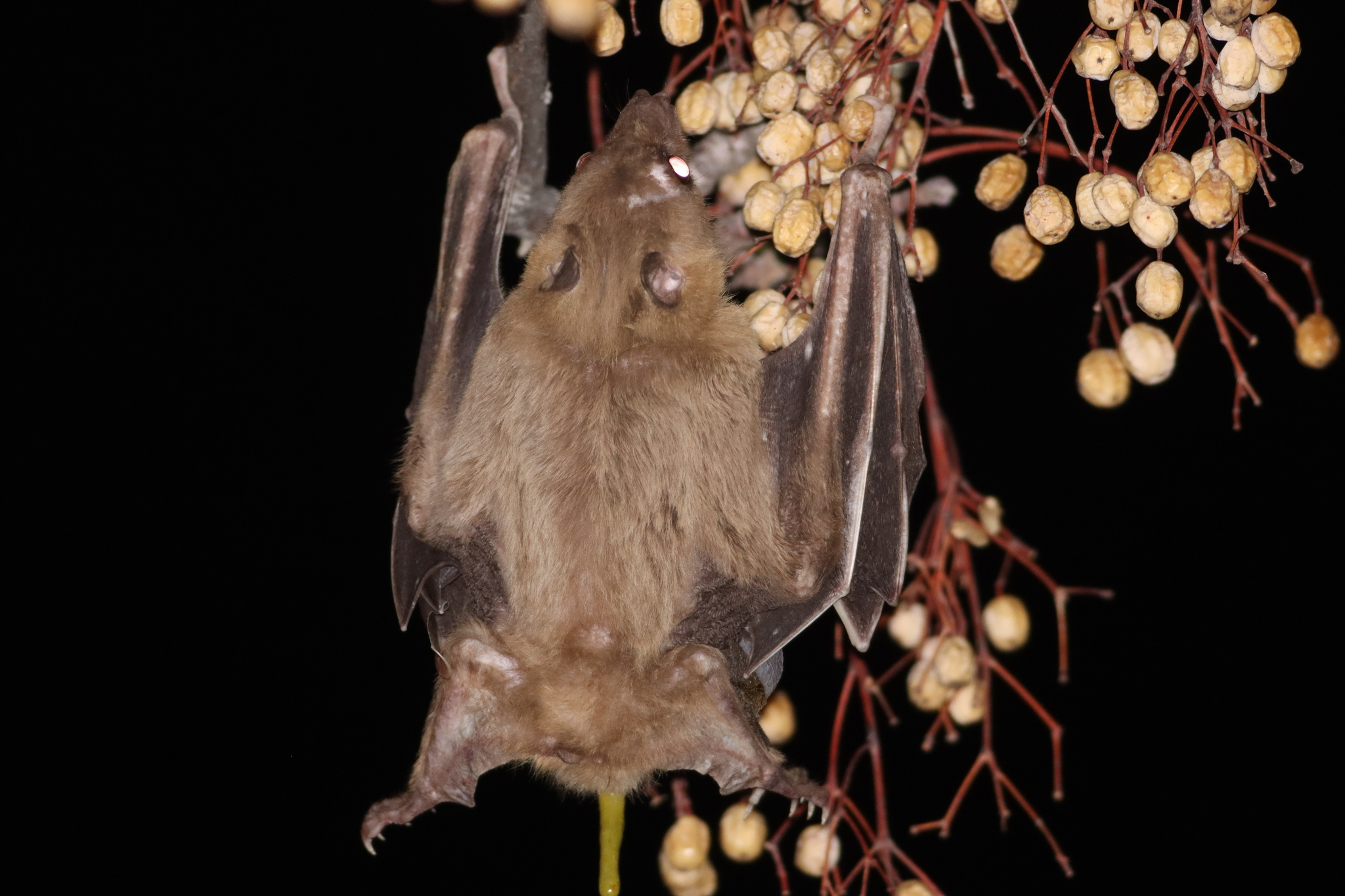
Feeding on chinaberries, in Turkey.

The Egyptian fruit bat is considered a medium-sized megabat. Adults have an average total body length of 15 cm (5.9 in) and an average wingspan of about 60 cm (24 in). Its forearm length is 81–102 mm (3.2–4.0 in) and its thumb length is 22–31 mm (0.87–1.22 in). Adults weigh 80–170 g (2.8–6.0 oz). Males are larger than females and can be easily distinguished by their large scrotums and the prominent, stiff strands of hair around their throats. It has a dental formula of 2.1.3.22.1.3.3 for a total of 34 teeth.

The fur on its body is relatively short and consists of soft and sleek strands. On its back, the fur's colour ranges from dark brown to grey-brown, while the colour on its underside is pale brown with a yellowish-brown collar around its neck. Its wings are of a darker brown than its body and the wing membranes attach to the leg at the first toe. Males and females are similar colours. Similar to other megachiropteran species, the Egyptian fruit bat only has claws on its first and second digits, while the other digits have extremities made of cartilage.

The Egyptian fruit bat has one of the greatest ratios of brain weight to body weight of any bat species. It is well adapted to seeing in low light and possesses a highly developed sense of smell. The regions of the brain associated with sight and smell are similarly well-developed. Its eyes are large and well-developed, while its ears are considered medium-length. As in all megabats, the choroid of the eye (vascular region between retina and sclera) has tiny projections known as papillae, which is where its photoreceptor cells are located.

== Distribution and habitat ==
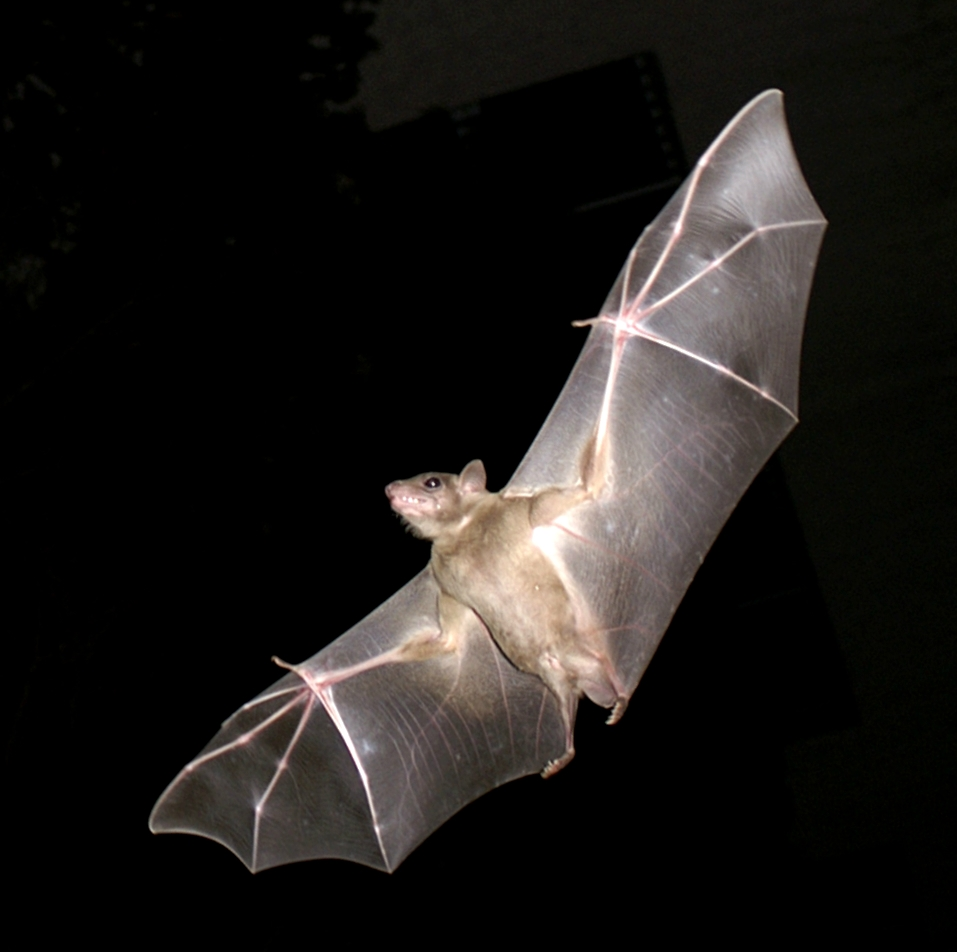
In flight in Israel

The Egyptian fruit bat is extensively dispersed across various locations and occurs throughout Africa, the Middle East, Pakistan and northern regions of the Indian subcontinent. In the Mediterranean region, it occurs on the mainland coast of Turkey and the island of Cyprus. It is the only frugivorous bat species in Europe. Outside of its normal natural distribution, an Egyptian fruit bat was observed in the Greek island of Kastellorizo during a zoological expedition in 2017. Usually, the Egyptian fruit bat inhabits tropical rainforests, savannas, or other forests, and tends to live in large colonies that consist of thousands of individuals in their established roosts. It prefers to establish roosts wherever there are plenty of fruiting trees nearby; most roosts are in caves. When no caves are nearby, it establishes roosts in cave-like human structures, such as abandoned depots and hangars.

== Behaviour and ecology ==
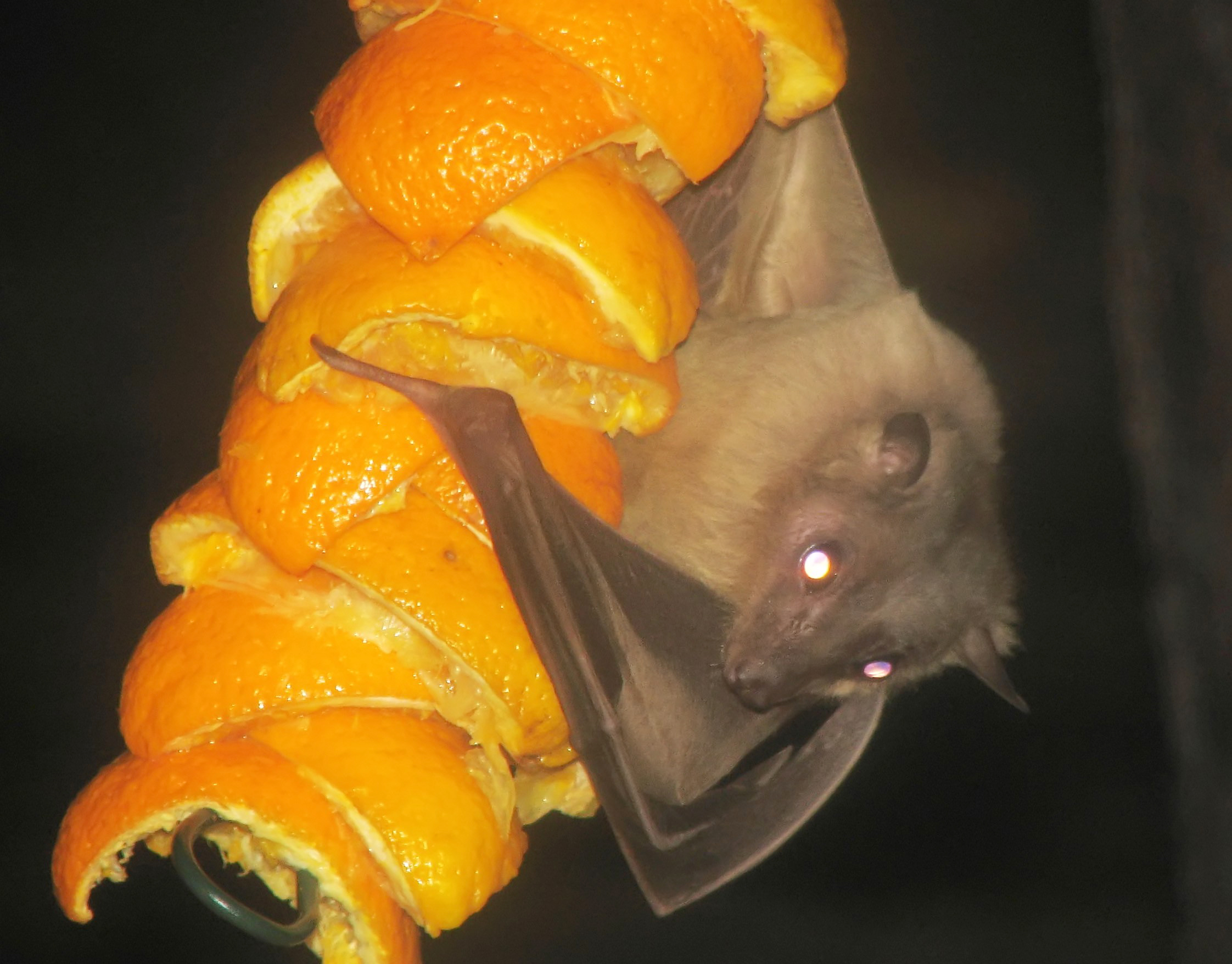
Clinging to pieces of orange at the Cotswold Wildlife Park, England

=== Diet and foraging ===
The Egyptian fruit bat is frugivorous, consuming mostly fruit, and leaves. It leaves its roost at dusk to begin foraging. The Egyptian fruit bat has a flexible diet, consuming any soft, pulpy fruit from fruiting trees, comprising Persian lilacs, loquat, figs, and wild dates. The type of fruit consumed is influenced by overall availability depending on the season and habitat type. Its dietary flexibility includes eating unripe fruit and fruit damaged by insects or fungi, allowing them to persist in habitats where ripe fruit is not permanently available.

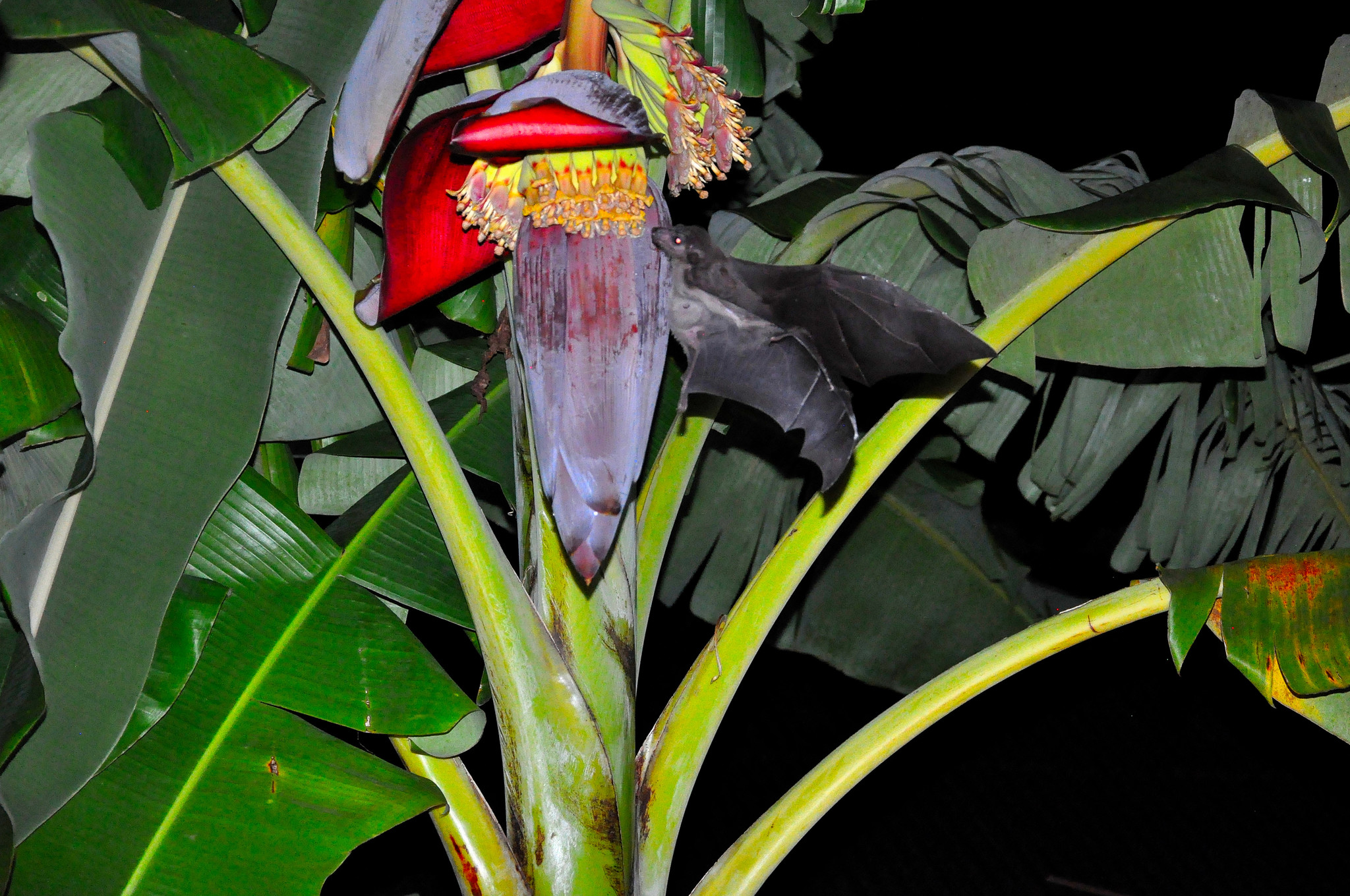
At a banana flower, in Tanzania

The Egyptian fruit bat usually makes multiple, short flights from its roost to various fruiting trees. It prefers to pick fruit and carry it back to the roost or another tree before eating it. A study of Egyptian fruit bats in Cyprus noted that if Egyptian fruit bats are aware of an abundant fruit source somewhere, they will travel distances of about 15–20 km (9.3–12.4 mi) to reach it. It eats large quantities of fruit each evening, equivalent to about 50 to 150 percent of its weight. While eating, it will hold the fruit tightly against its body to prevent theft by other bats. Its intestinal transit time is rapid, with food passing through the small and large intestines in 18–100 minutes. The Egyptian fruit bat serves as a seed disperser of large and small seeds. Seeds are dispersed 25–400 m (82–1,312 ft) away from parent trees. Even seeds too large to ingest are dispersed due to its habit of picking fruit in one tree and consuming them in another, where larger seeds are spat out.

Egyptian fruit bats are ecologically important as pollinators or seed dispersers for many species of trees and plants. The baobab tree, for instance, relies almost exclusively on fruit bats to pollinate its flowers.

=== Mating, reproduction and life cycle ===
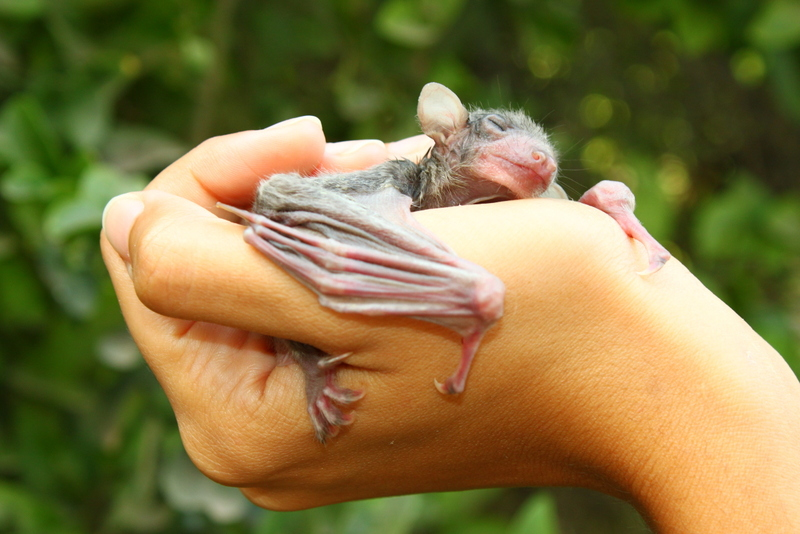
Young Egyptian fruit bat

The Egyptian fruit bat has two breeding seasons; the first is from April to August, while the second season is from October to February. When the breeding season begins, the bats within the colony separate based on sex. The males gather together to form bachelor groups while the females form maternity colonies. Female bats have control over copulation; therefore, to increase the chances of mating, male Egyptian fruit bats will provide a nuptial gift to the female bat. The nuptial gifts are fruit that the male allows the female to scrounge. By allowing the female to scrounge, it strengthens the bond between the pair, thus increasing the probability of the female copulating with a given male. Females typically give birth to only a single offspring each year (called a "pup"), but twins are occasionally born, after a gestation period of around 115 to 120 days. Newborn Egyptian fruit bat pups are altricial at birth with their eyes shut until they are nine days old. The female carries the pup until it is six weeks old, which is when it can hang in the roost on its own. Afterwards, the pup is left in the roost while the mother forages. Before the pup is left in the roost, the mother repeatedly transports the pup to the same tree and is left there for the night while the mother forages. The pup learns this location and visits it first when at about three months of age, the pup will leave the roost on its own to forage for its food. They only become independent from their mothers after nine months, once they have finally reached their adult physique. Offspring typically stay with the same colony as the parents for their entire lives.

In the wild, the average lifespan of the Egyptian fruit bat ranges from 8 to 10 years, while in captivity its lifespan is up to 22 years with proper care. The significant difference between the lifespan of Egyptian fruit bats in the wild versus ones in captivity is mostly because of the wild bats' increased exposure to predation and vitamin D deficiency.

=== Predators and parasites ===
The Egyptian fruit bat has several avian predators, including hawks, owls, and falcons, specifically the lanner falcon. A mammalian predator is the genet. External parasites (ectoparasites) of the Egyptian fruit bat include parasitic mites like Spinturnix lateralis, Liponyssus, and several Ancystropus species. Others parasitic taxa are flies like Eucampsipoda, Nycteribosca, and Nycteribia. Fleas that parasitise it include Archaeopsylla and Thaumapsylla, and it has also been documented with the tick Alectorobius camicasi. Internal parasites (endoparasites) are the hemosporidian Plasmodium roussetti, which causes malaria, and the roundworm Nycteridocoptes rousetti.

=== Voice ===
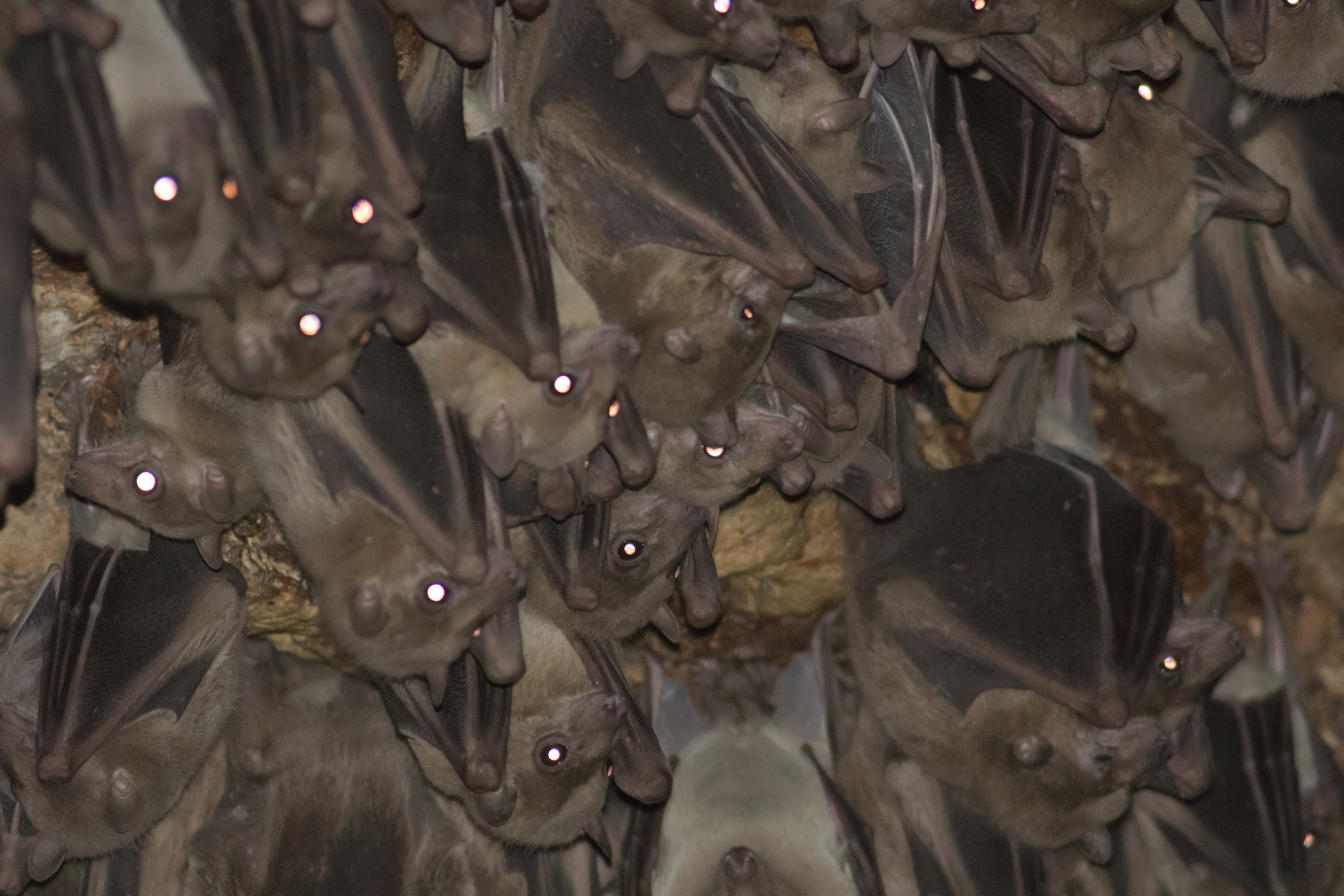
A colony of Egyptian fruit bats in a roost at Ha-Teomim cave in Israel

The Egyptian fruit bat is among the few megabats using echolocation. Although it is considered a primitive form compared to non-megabat species, this has been questioned. A few other megabat species echolocate via creating clicks with their wings. It echolocates by emitting a series of sharp, bidirectional click pairs with its tongue and by altering teeth and lip positions. The clicks are normally slow and constant, but speed up dramatically when the bat approaches an object. This allows it to effectively navigate in darkness.

It also makes use of a range of calls for communication, including grunts and screeches, to communicate with other bats within the colony. As a result, a large roosting colony can be a deafening cacophony. Additionally, according to several studies, it is thought that because of their constant exposure to thousands of other individuals, they can form their own language to interact with one another about specific topics such as food. Colonies of Egyptian fruit bats develop their own dialects, producing sounds at different frequencies. Egyptian fruit bat pups acquire the dialect of their colonies by listening to their mothers' calls.

== Relationship with humans ==
=== As pests ===
Since fruit bats also eat commercially grown fruit intended for human consumption, many of them are poisoned or otherwise persecuted and eliminated by farmers to prevent crop loss. In Turkey and Cyprus, farmers have poisoned Egyptian fruit bats via insecticides and pesticides. Other techniques used to kill the bats include using dynamite to destroy cave roosts, or fumigating cave entrances with sulfur to exterminate entire bat colonies. While Egyptian fruit bats do eat commercially grown fruit, the percentage of crops lost to bats may be overestimated.

=== As disease reservoir ===
The Egyptian fruit bat has been a suspected reservoir for several human diseases under surveillance. It has been suggested that it can spread Marburg virus to conspecifics through contact with infected excretions such as guano, but a 2018 review concluded that more studies are necessary to determine the specific mechanisms of exposure that cause Marburg virus disease in humans. Exposure to guano could be a route of transmission to humans. It has been documented with antibodies against Ebola virus in its blood, known as being seropositive, but has not tested positive for the virus itself. Evidence that it or any other megabat species is the natural reservoir of Ebola virus is "far from decisive".

=== In captivity ===
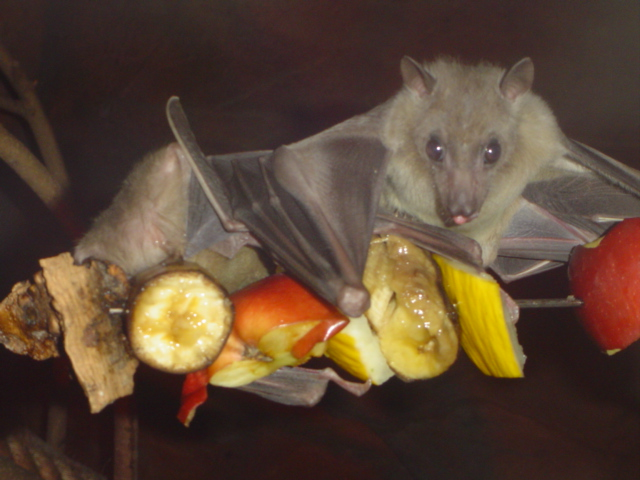
Two captive individuals on a skewer of fruit

The Egyptian fruit bat is well represented in zoos around the world. As of 2015, there were 616 Egyptian fruit bats housed in twenty-three Association of Zoos and Aquariums (AZA) member facilities, slightly more than 5% of all captive bat individuals of twenty-eight different species. In the future, the AZA emphasised the need to ensure that males are rotated among facilities to promote genetic variation within the captive population. Captive individuals are susceptible to haemochromatosis (iron overload), necessitating further research into the dietary risk factors for this condition, as well as general nutritional requirements for the Egyptian fruit bat. While import of fruit bats into the US is usually closely regulated, a procedural error in 1994 allowed the importation of thousands of Egyptian fruit bats (and other species). Given that the Egyptian fruit bat is highly adaptable, there are concerns that, through the pet trade, it could become an introduced species in the southern United States, competing with native animals and causing destruction to fruit agriculture.

=== As model animals ===
The Egyptian fruit bat is used as a model animal in navigation research. They are especially suitable for this kind of research, because they use visual inputs in conjunction with echolocation to navigate. Additionally, their head is large enough to hold a wireless device that holds both electrodes that go into the brain and measure electrical activity of the cells, as well as a tracking device. This method was used to show that bats have place cells, which are cells that track their location, as well as head direction cells, which track the orientation of their head. Additionally they have vector cells, which contain a representation of the location relative to an important object. The bats are of particular interest, because these three types of cells have been shown to represent location and direction in 3D. Bats also have cells that represent the location of other bats, which researchers have called 'social place cells'. Similarly, bats have cells that represent the location of human experimenters.

Friedrich Loeffler Institute (FLI) in Germany, Centers for Disease Control and Prevention in Atlanta, GA, and Colorado State University (CSU) in Fort Collins, CO have Egyptian fruit bat colonies. These bats are born and bred in biolab captivity for infection research. According to FLI, Egyptian fruit bats are a "reservoir host" and "useful model" for SARS-CoV-2 research, "although this species is certainly not the original reservoir of SARS-CoV-2 because these bats are not present in China, the epicentre of the pandemic."
