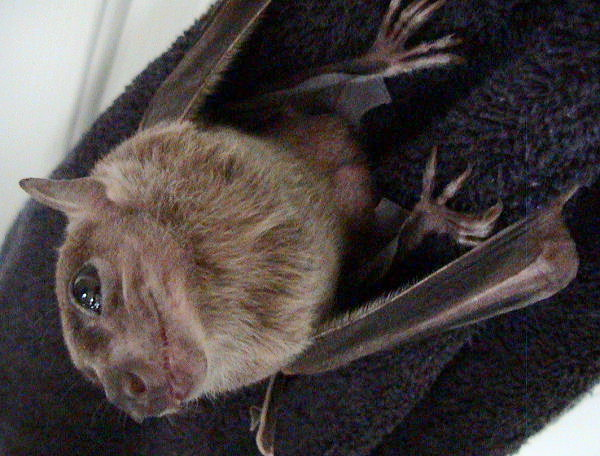
- Egyptian rousette or Egyptian fruit bat, Rousettus aegypticus

Scientific classification
- Kingdom: Animalia
- Phylum: Chordata
- Class: Mammalia
- Order: Chiroptera
- Family: Pteropodidae
- Subfamily: Rousettinae
- Tribe: Rousettini; Andersen, 1912
- Genus: Rousettus; Gray, 1821

Type species
- Pteropus aegyptiacus Geoffroy, 1810

Species
- 7 species, see text

= Rousettus =

Genus of bats

Rousettus is a genus of Old World fruit bats or megabats, referred to as rousette bats. The genus is a member of the family Pteropodidae. The genus consists of seven species that range over most of Africa to southeast Asia, and the islands of the south Pacific. They are among the few megabats capable of echolocation, and the only genus of megabats known to use vocal echolocation.

== Classification ==
Genus Rousettus – rousette fruit bats

- Geoffroy's rousette, R. amplexicaudatus
- Egyptian fruit bat or Egyptian rousette, R. aegyptiacus
- Leschenault's rousette, R. leschenaulti
- Linduan rousette, R. linduensis
- Comoro rousette, R. obliviosus
- Bare-backed rousette, R. spinalatus
- Madagascan rousette, R. madagascariensis

The species in the genera Boneia, Stenonycteris, and Pilonycteris were also formerly classified in Rousettus, but phylogenetic analysis supports them being their own genera.
