= Azagnyi fruit bat =

Conservation status
- Least Concern (IUCN 3.1)

Scientific classification
- Kingdom: Animalia
- Phylum: Chordata
- Class: Mammalia
- Order: Chiroptera
- Family: Pteropodidae
- Genus: Megaloglossus
- Species: M. azagnyi

Binomial name
- Megaloglossus azagnyi Nesi, Kadjo & Hassanin, 2012

Species of bat

The Azagnyi fruit bat (Megaloglossus azagnyi), also called the western Woermann’s fruit bat, is a species of megabat found in Africa.

== Taxonomy and etymology ==
It was described as a new species in 2012. Its description was the result of a taxonomic split of the Woermann's bat, which was previously the monotypic representative of the genus Megaloglossus. Its species name "azagnyi" is derived from Azagny National Park in Ivory Coast. Azagny National Park is the type locality for the species.

== Description ==
The Azagnyi fruit bat is a relatively small frugivorous bat species, weighing 9–14 g (0.32–0.49 oz). Its forearm length is 38–42 mm (1.5–1.7 in). Its fur is uniformly dark brown with ventral fur somewhat paler than dorsal fur. Males have a "collar" of creamy white fur across their necks. Overall, it is similar in appearance to Woermann's bat, though its skull dimensions are smaller.

== Range and status ==
Its range includes several countries in West Africa, including Ivory Coast, Ghana, Guinea, Liberia, Sierra Leone, and Togo. It is found in association with lowland rainforests. It is currently evaluated as least-concern by the IUCN — its lowest conservation priority.
