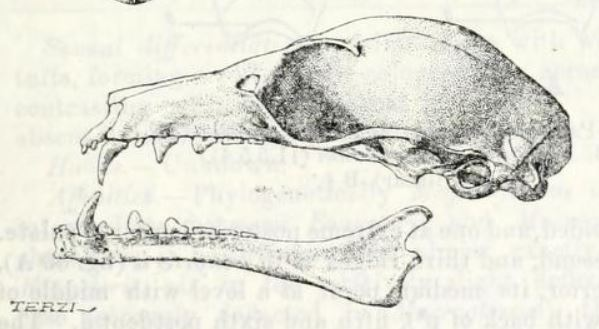
- Skull of Megaloglossus woermanni

Scientific classification
- Domain: Eukaryota
- Kingdom: Animalia
- Phylum: Chordata
- Class: Mammalia
- Order: Chiroptera
- Family: Pteropodidae
- Genus: Megaloglossus; Pagenstecher, 1885

Type species
- Megaloglossus woermanni Pagenstecher, 1885

Species
- Megaloglossus azagnyi; Megaloglossus woermanni

Synonyms
- Trygenycteris Lydekker, 1891

= Megaloglossus =

Genus of bats

Megaloglossus is a genus of bats in the family Pteropodidae. It is native to Africa. It contains two species, Megaloglossus azagnyi and Megaloglossus woermanni. Prior to 2012, it was considered a monotypic genus. In 2012, however, M. woermanni was split into two species with the description of M. azagnyi. It was described as a new species in 2012.

== Range ==
Both species are found in West and Central Africa.
