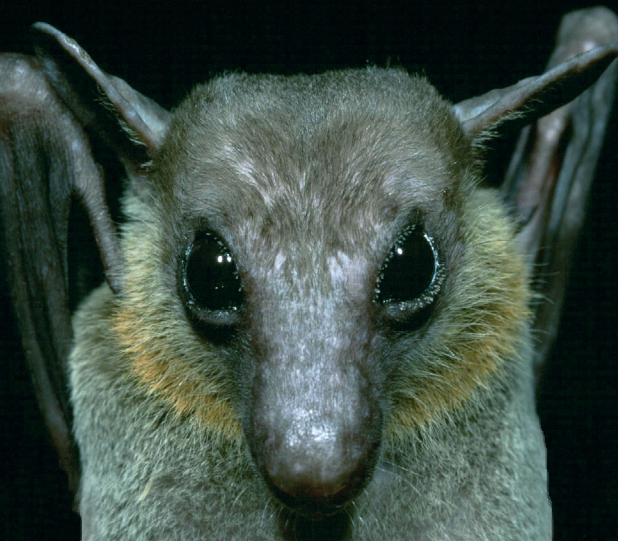
- Eonycteris spelaea

Scientific classification
- Domain: Eukaryota
- Kingdom: Animalia
- Phylum: Chordata
- Class: Mammalia
- Order: Chiroptera
- Family: Pteropodidae
- Subfamily: Rousettinae
- Tribe: Eonycterini; Almeida, Giannini & Simmons, 2016
- Genus: Eonycteris; Dobson, 1873

Type species
- Macroglossus spelaeus Dobson, 1871

Species
- E. major E. spelaea E. robusta

= Eonycteris =

Genus of bats

Eonycteris ("dawn bat") is a genus of megabats found in Asia. They are the only members of the tribe Eonycterini. Species within this genus are:

- Greater nectar bat, Eonycteris major
- Cave nectar bat, Eonycteris spelaea
- Philippine dawn bat, Eonycteris robusta
