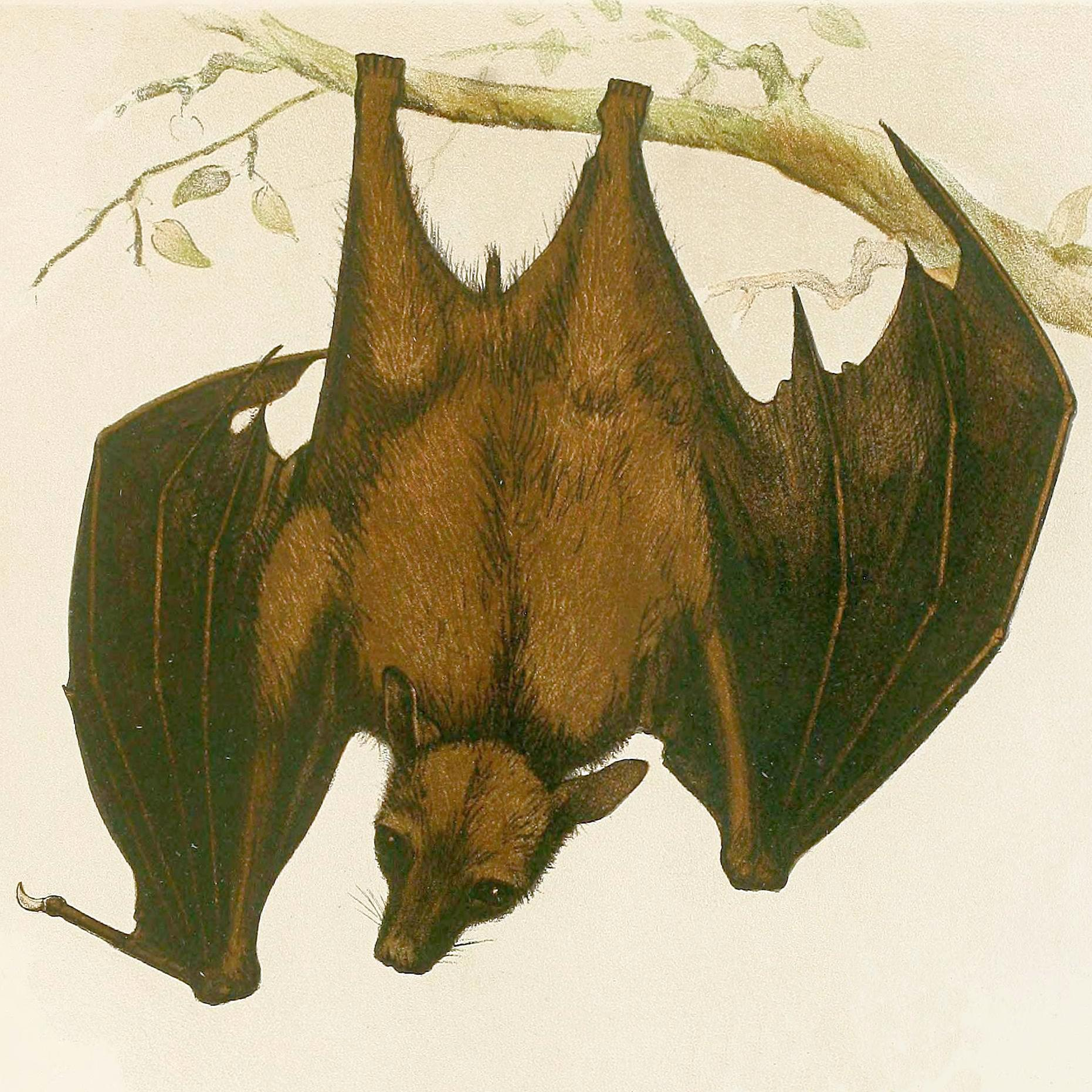

Conservation status
- Least Concern (IUCN 3.1)

Scientific classification
- Kingdom: Animalia
- Phylum: Chordata
- Class: Mammalia
- Order: Chiroptera
- Family: Pteropodidae
- Subfamily: Rousettinae
- Tribe: Stenonycterini; Nesi et al, 2012
- Genus: Stenonycteris; Thomas, 1906
- Species: S. lanosa

Binomial name
- Stenonycteris lanosa (Thomas, 1906)
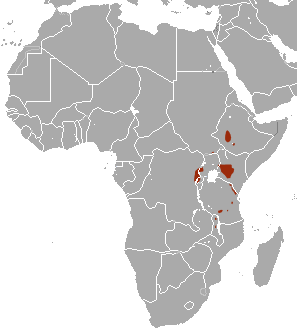
- Long-haired rousette range

= Long-haired fruit bat =

Species of bat

The long-haired fruit bat (Stenonycteris lanosa), also known as the long-haired rousette, is a species of megabat in the family Pteropodidae. It is the only member of the genus Stenonycteris. It was formerly classified in the genus Rousettus until a 2013 phylogenetic study found it to belong to its own genus and tribe.

It is native to the Democratic Republic of the Congo, Ethiopia, Kenya, Malawi, Rwanda, South Sudan, Tanzania, and Uganda. Its natural habitat is subtropical or tropical moist montane forests.
