= Manado fruit bat =

Conservation status
- Vulnerable (IUCN 3.1)

Scientific classification
- Kingdom: Animalia
- Phylum: Chordata
- Class: Mammalia
- Order: Chiroptera
- Family: Pteropodidae
- Subfamily: Harpyionycterinae
- Genus: Boneia; Jentink, 1879
- Species: B. bidens

Binomial name
- Boneia bidens Jentink, 1879
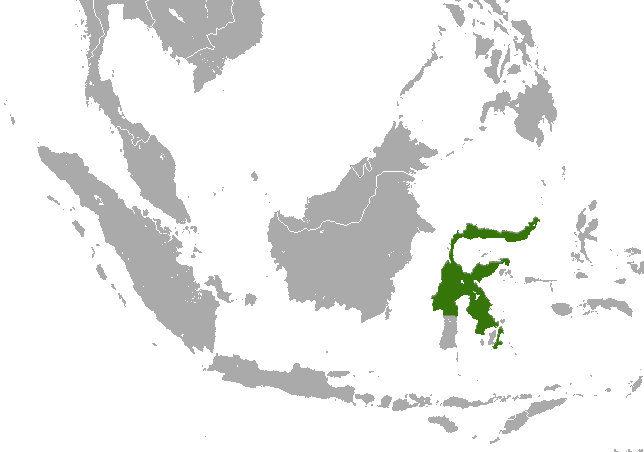
- Manado fruit bat range

Synonyms
- Rousettus bidens

Species of bat

The Manado fruit bat (Boneia bidens) is a species of megabat in the family Pteropodidae.

It is the only member of the genus Boneia. It was formerly classified in the genus Rousettus, but phylogenetic evidence supports them being distinct and belonging to completely different subfamilies: Rousettus belonging in Rousettinae, Boneia belonging in Harpyionycterinae.

It is endemic to Sulawesi island in Indonesia, including in North Sulawesi Province.).
