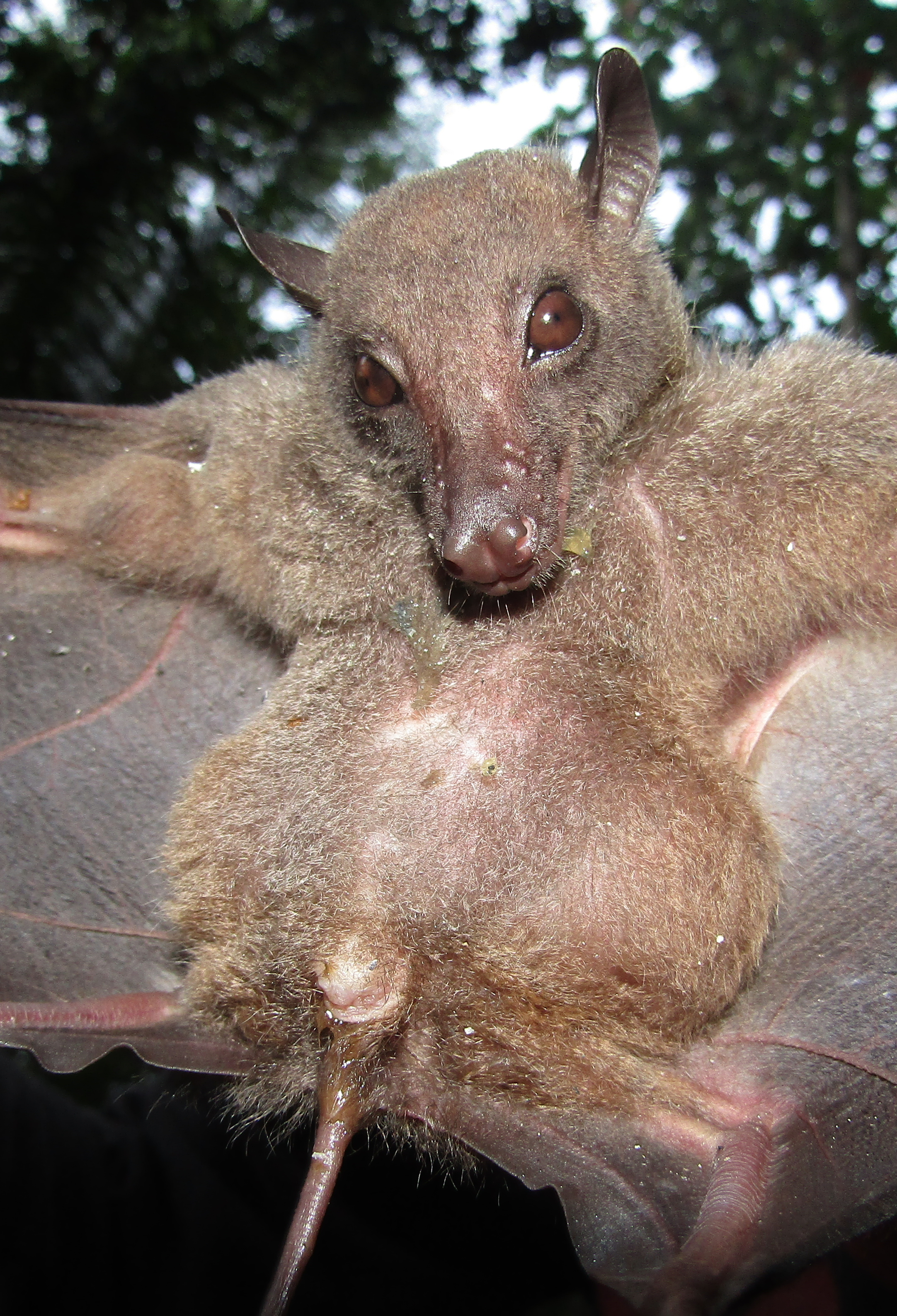

Conservation status
- Least Concern (IUCN 3.1)

Scientific classification
- Kingdom: Animalia
- Phylum: Chordata
- Class: Mammalia
- Order: Chiroptera
- Family: Pteropodidae
- Subfamily: Rousettinae
- Genus: Pilonycteris; Nesi, Tsang, Simmons, McGowen & Rossiter, 2021
- Species: P. celebensis

Binomial name
- Pilonycteris celebensis (K. Andersen, 1907)
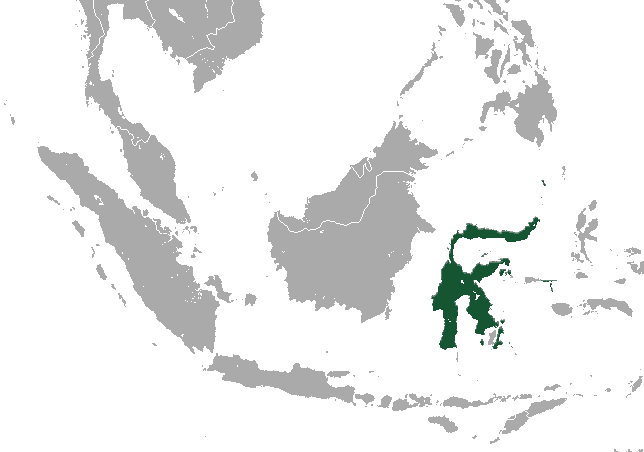
- Sulawesi rousette range

Synonyms
- Rousettus celebensis

= Sulawesi rousette =

Species of bat

The Sulawesi rousette or Sulawesi fruit bat (Pilonycteris celebensis) is a species of megabat in the family Pteropodidae endemic to Sulawesi, an island in Indonesia. It is presently the only member of the genus Pilonycteris.

== Taxonomy ==
It was formerly classified in the genus Rousettus until 2021, when a phylogenetic study found it to belong to its own genus (and tribe, although a new tribe was not described for it) that was more derived than Rousettus, which was described as Pilonycteris. P. celebensis is thought to be the only member of Pilonycteris, but Rousettus linduensis may also belong.

== Description ==
The tibia of the Sulawesi rousette bat is covered in dense fur. Its antitragal lobe is fairly reduced. The bony arch of its cheek is narrow and triangular in shape. The male's distal end of the penis has a flattened and triangular shape.

== Diet ==
Rousettus celebensis is a fruit-eating bat; it has big wings which allow it to carry heavy loads and also make it a good seed disperser. Its diet consists of large seeds, an uncommon feature, compared to other frugivorous bats. R. celebensis has a unique digestive system which allows it to digest certain seeds or seed coats or both.
