= East African epauletted fruit bat =

Conservation status
- Least Concern (IUCN 3.1)

Scientific classification
- Kingdom: Animalia
- Phylum: Chordata
- Class: Mammalia
- Order: Chiroptera
- Family: Pteropodidae
- Genus: Epomophorus
- Species: E. minimus

Binomial name
- Epomophorus minimus Claessen & Vree, 1991
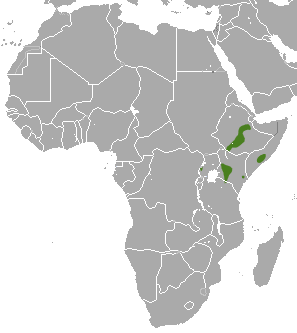
- East African epauletted fruit bat range

Species of bat

The East African epauletted fruit bat (Epomophorus minimus) is a species of megabat in the family Pteropodidae. It is found in Ethiopia, Kenya, Somalia, Tanzania, and Uganda. Its natural habitats are dry savanna and rocky areas.
