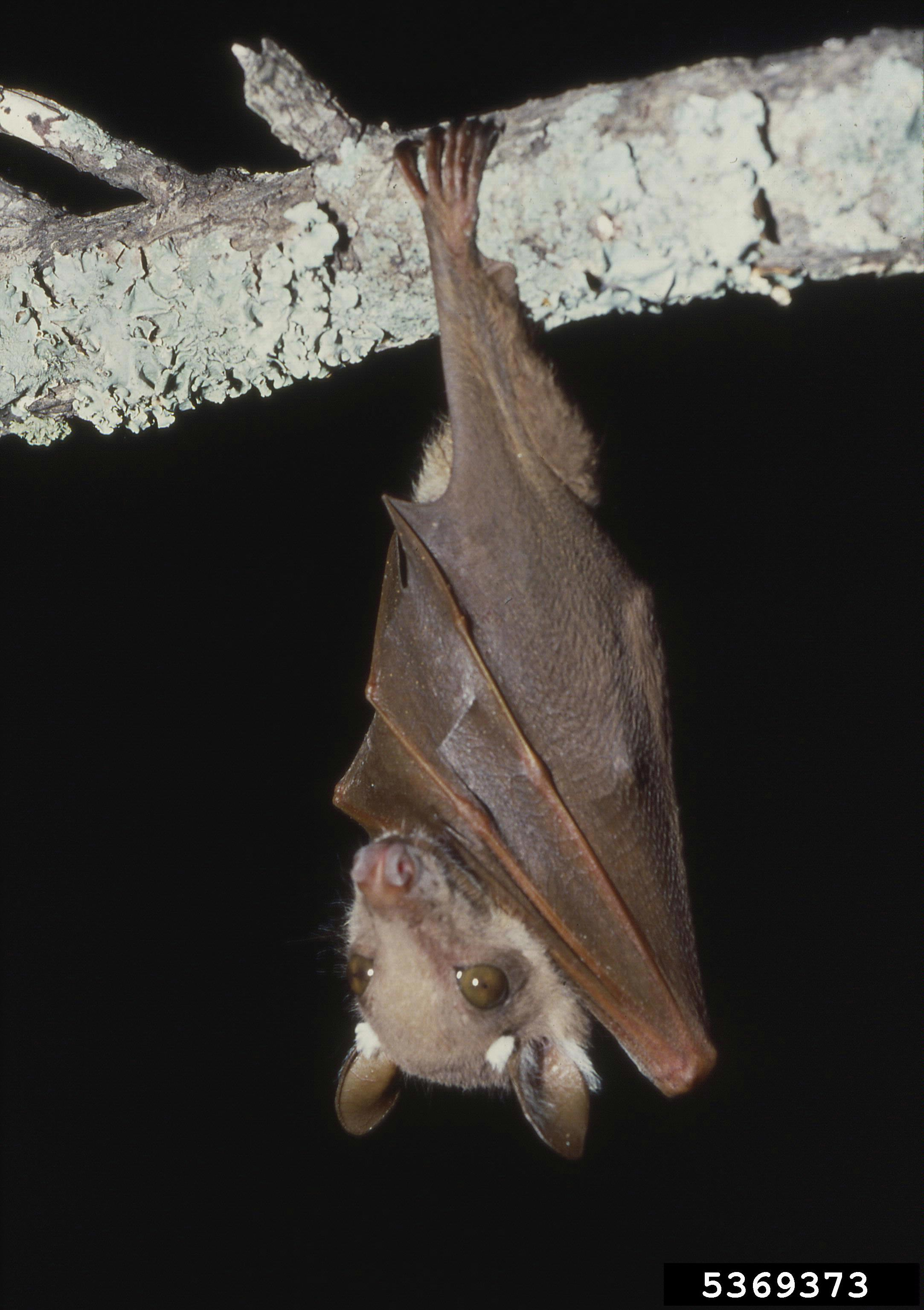
- Wahlberg's epauletted fruit bat, Epomophorus wahlbergi

Scientific classification
- Kingdom: Animalia
- Phylum: Chordata
- Class: Mammalia
- Infraclass: Placentalia
- Order: Chiroptera
- Family: Pteropodidae
- Subfamily: Epomophorinae
- Genus: Epomophorus; Bennett, 1836

Type species
- Pteropus gambianus Ogilby, 1835

Species
- See text

= Epomophorus =

Genus of bats

Epomophorus (epauletted bat) is a genus of bat in the family Pteropodidae. They have a distribution throughout Africa.

== Species ==
Epomophorus contains the following species:

- Angolan epauletted fruit bat, Epomophorus angolensis
- Ansell's epauletted fruit bat, Epomophorus anselli
- Peters's epauletted fruit bat, Epomophorus crypturus
- Dobson's epauletted fruit bat, Epomophorus dobsonii
- Gambian epauletted fruit bat, Epomophorus gambianus
- Lesser Angolan epauletted fruit bat, Epomophorus grandis
- Ethiopian epauletted fruit bat, Epomophorus labiatus
- East African epauletted fruit bat, Epomophorus minimus
- Minor epauletted fruit bat, Epomophorus minor
- Wahlberg's epauletted fruit bat, Epomophorus wahlbergi
