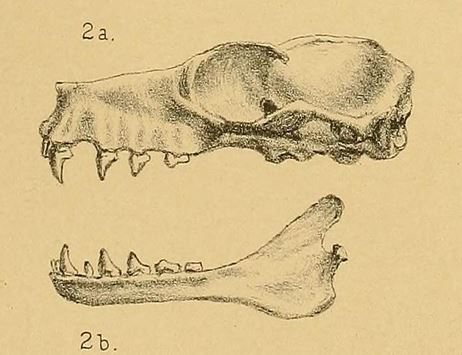

Conservation status
- Least Concern (IUCN 3.1)

Scientific classification
- Kingdom: Animalia
- Phylum: Chordata
- Class: Mammalia
- Order: Chiroptera
- Family: Pteropodidae
- Genus: Epomophorus
- Species: E. minor

Binomial name
- Epomophorus minor Dobson 1879/1880
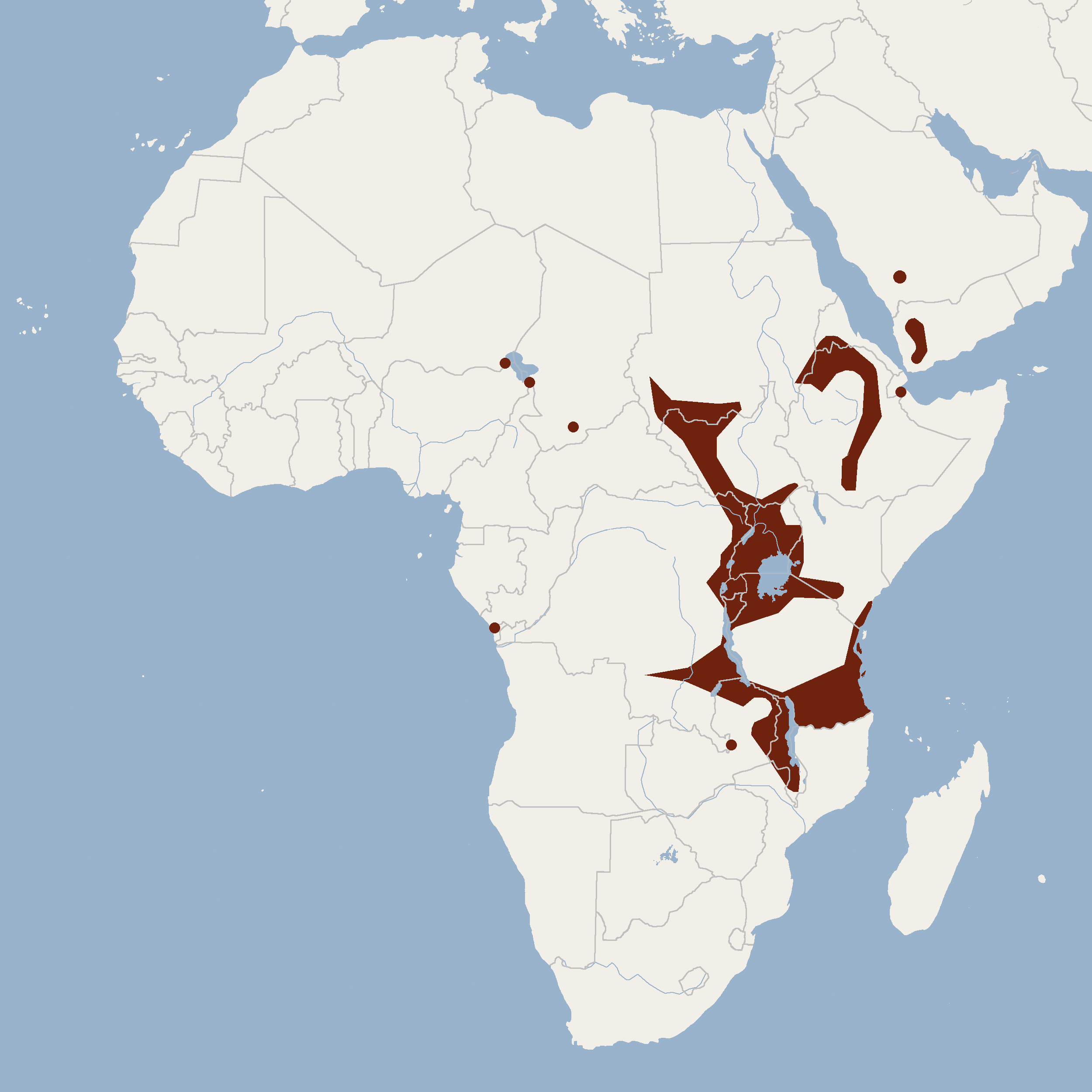

Synonyms
- Little epauletted fruit-bat

= Minor epauletted fruit bat =

Species of bat

The minor epauletted fruit bat (Epomophorus minor) is a species of megabat in the family Pteropodidae. It is found in Zambia, Tanzania, Mozambique and Kenya.
