= Dobson's epauletted fruit bat =

Conservation status
- Least Concern (IUCN 3.1)

Scientific classification
- Kingdom: Animalia
- Phylum: Chordata
- Class: Mammalia
- Order: Chiroptera
- Family: Pteropodidae
- Genus: Epomophorus
- Species: E. dobsonii

Binomial name
- Epomophorus dobsonii (Bocage, 1899)
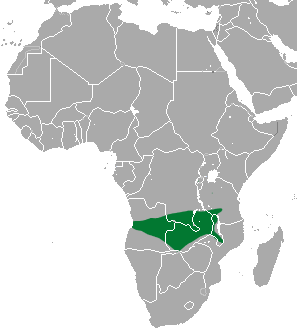
- Dobson's epauletted fruit bat range

Species of bat

Dobson's epauletted fruit bat, or Dobson's fruit bat (Epomophorus dobsonii) is a species of megabat in the family Pteropodidae. It is found in Angola, Democratic Republic of the Congo, Malawi, Mozambique, Rwanda, Tanzania, and Zambia. Its natural habitat is dry savanna.
