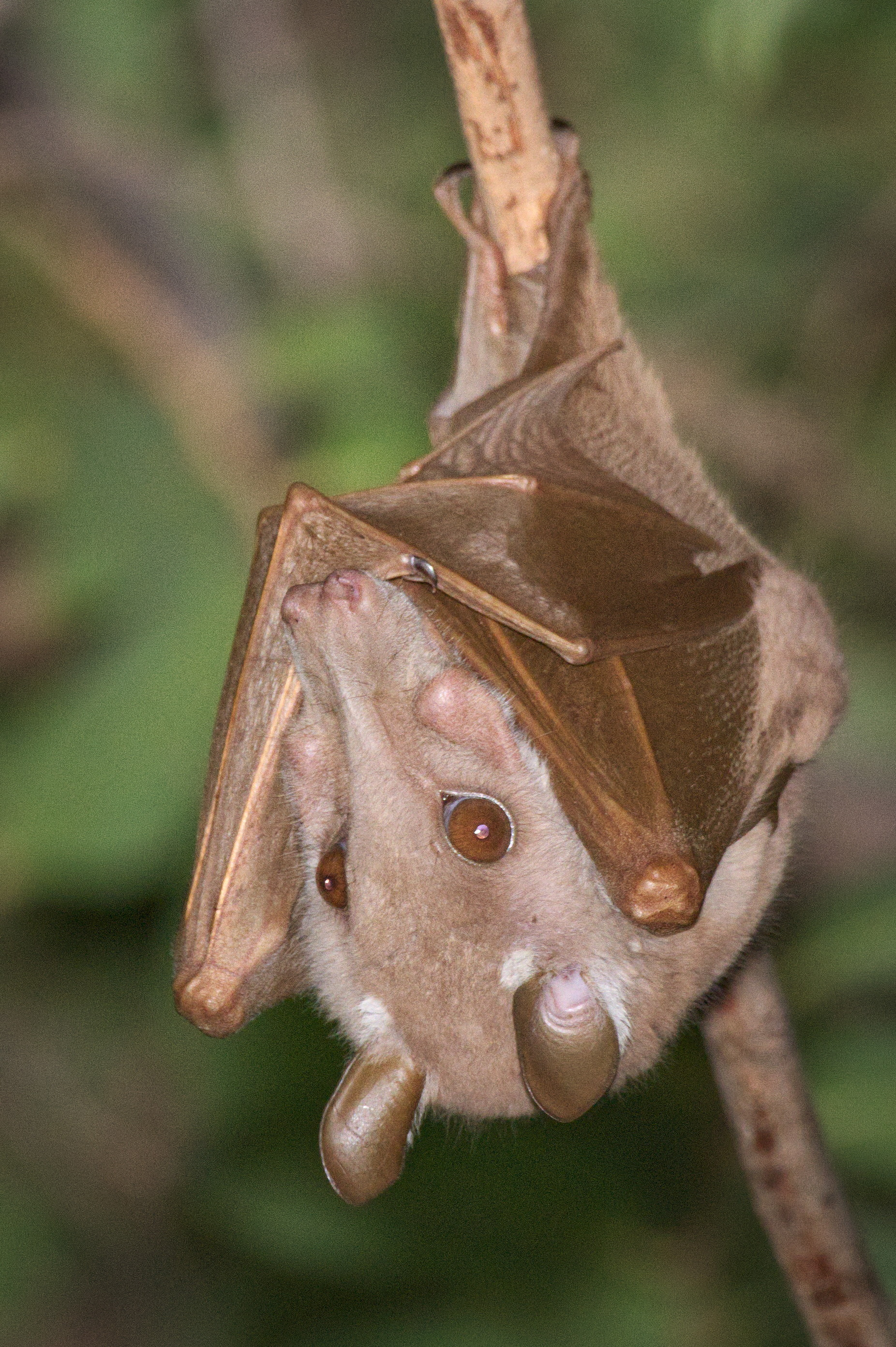

Conservation status
- Near Threatened (IUCN 3.1)

Scientific classification
- Kingdom: Animalia
- Phylum: Chordata
- Class: Mammalia
- Order: Chiroptera
- Family: Pteropodidae
- Genus: Epomophorus
- Species: E. angolensis

Binomial name
- Epomophorus angolensis Gray, 1870
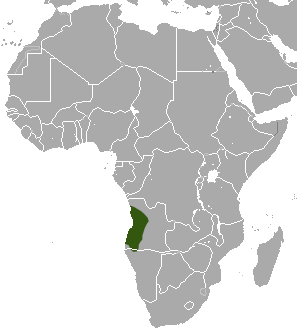

= Angolan epauletted fruit bat =

Species of bat

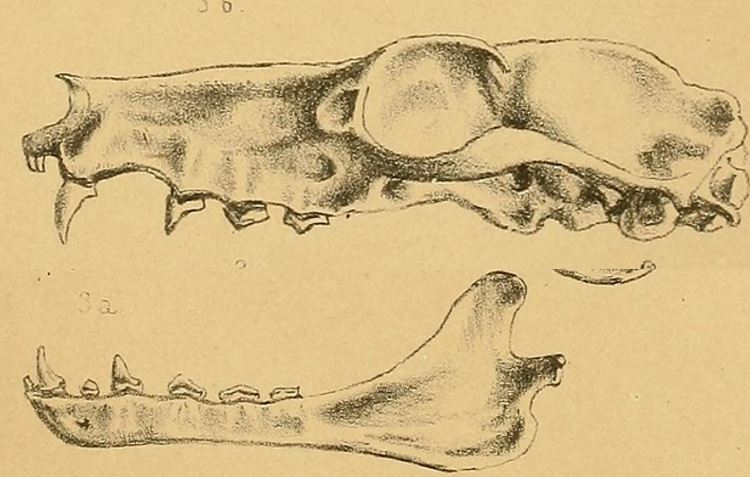
Skull

The Angolan epauletted fruit bat (Epomophorus angolensis) is a species of megabat in the family Pteropodidae. It is found in Angola and Namibia. Its natural habitat is savanna.

== Taxonomy and etymology ==
It was described as a new species in 1870 by British zoologist John Edward Gray. Gray described it as a "variety" of Epomophorus macrocephalus, which has since been synonymized with the Angolan epauletted fruit bat. Its species name "angolensis" is Latin for "Angolan."

== Range and status ==
It is found only in Angola and Namibia. It is generally found in low-lying areas, though its range may include some montane habitats as well. As of 2016, it was evaluated as a near-threatened species by the IUCN.
