= Lesser Angolan epauletted fruit bat =

Conservation status
- Data Deficient (IUCN 3.1)

Scientific classification
- Kingdom: Animalia
- Phylum: Chordata
- Class: Mammalia
- Order: Chiroptera
- Family: Pteropodidae
- Genus: Epomophorus
- Species: E. grandis

Binomial name
- Epomophorus grandis (Sanborn, 1950)
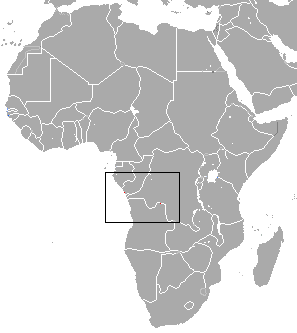
- Lesser Angolan epauletted fruit bat range

Synonyms
- Micropteropus grandis Sanborn, 1950

Species of bat

The lesser Angolan epauletted fruit bat (Epomophorus grandis) is a species of megabat in the family Pteropodidae. It is found in Angola and the Republic of the Congo. Its natural habitats are subtropical or tropical dry and moist lowland forest, and savanna.

== Taxonomy ==
The lesser Angolan epauletted fruit bat was described as a new species in 1950 by Colin Campbell Sanborn. Sanborn placed it in the genus Micropteropus, with a binomen of Micropteropus grandis. The holotype had been collected at Dundo, Angola.

== Description ==
Based on three individuals, it has a forearm length of 62–66 mm (2.4–2.6 in). It has a dental formula of 2.1.2.12.1.3.2 for a total of 28 teeth. The fur of its back is a pale, reddish-brown, while the fur of its belly is pale or whitish brown. Its ears are brown, short, and somewhat pointed at the tips.

== Range and status ==
It is native to Africa where it has been documented in two countries: Angola and the Republic of the Congo. As of 2016, it had only been documented in the type locality of Dundo, Angola in addition to Pointe-Noire, Congo. Its habitat is likely savanna, though may also include tropical forest.

As of 2016, it was evaluated as a data deficient species by the IUCN.
