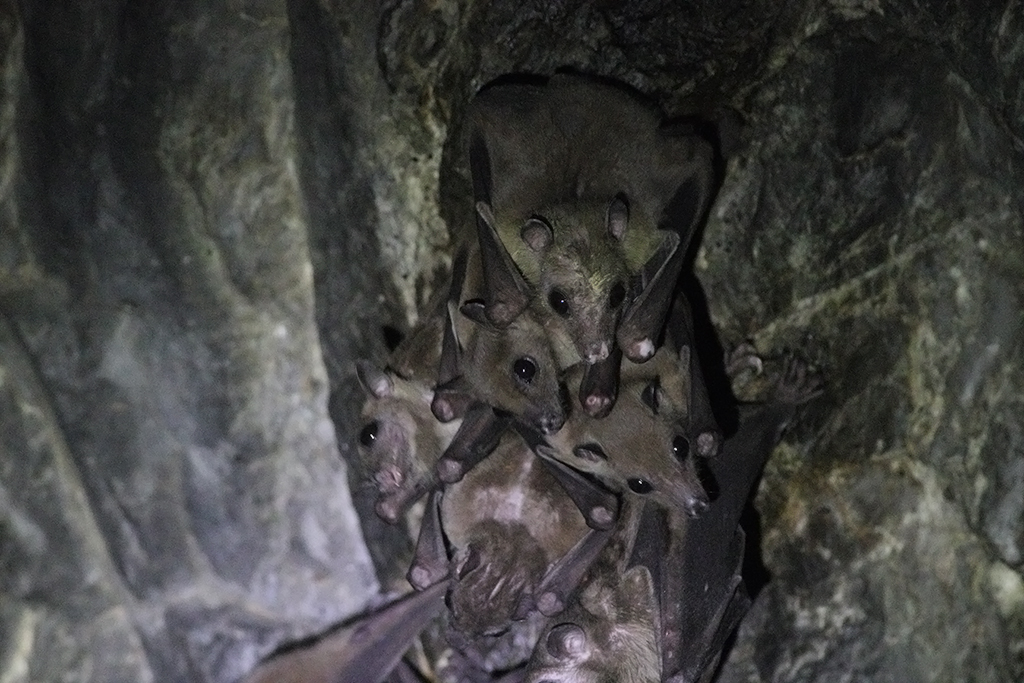

Conservation status
- Near Threatened (IUCN 3.1)

Scientific classification
- Kingdom: Animalia
- Phylum: Chordata
- Class: Mammalia
- Order: Chiroptera
- Family: Pteropodidae
- Genus: Rousettus
- Species: R. leschenaultii

Binomial name
- Rousettus leschenaultii (Desmarest, 1820)

Subspecies
- R. l. leschenaultii (Desmarest, 1820); R. l. shortridgei Thomas & Wroughton, 1909; R. l. seminudus (Kelaart, 1850)
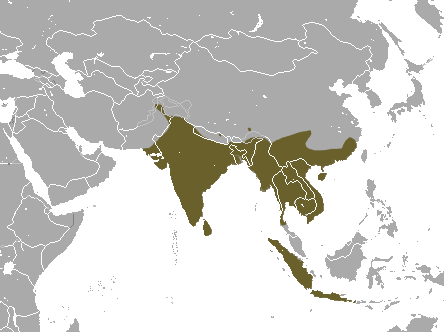
- Leschenault's rousette range

Synonyms
- Pteropus leschenaultii Desmarest, 1820; Xantharpyia Leschenaultii (Desmarest, 1820); Pteropus pyrivorus Hodgson, 1835; Pteropus pirivarus Hodgson, 1841; Cynopterus affinis J. E. Gray, 1843; Cynopterus marginatus J. E. Gray, 1843; Pteropus Privorus Hodgson, 1844; Pteropus seminudus Kelaart, 1850; Pteropus taraiyensis J. E. Gray, 1863; Eleutherura fuliginosa J. E. Gray, 1871

= Leschenault's rousette =

Species of bat

Leschenault's rousette (Rousettus leschenaultii), also known as the fulvous fruit bat or Shortridge's rousette, is a species of bat belonging to the family Pteropodidae, the fruit bats. This bat is found in southern Asia.

== Taxonomy ==
Leschenault's rousette was first formally described as Pteropus leschenaultii in 1820 by the French zoologist Anselme Gaëtan Desmarest with its type locality given as Pondicherry in India. Leschenault's rousette is classified in the genus Rousettus, the only gneus in the monotypic tribe Rousettini. This tribe is classified in the subfamily Rousettinae of the family Pteropidae, the fruit bats, flying foxes or megabats.

== Description ==
Leschenault's rousette is brown to grey-brown in colour with lighter underparts. It has long pale hairs under the chin, an elongated muzzle and large dark eyes. The head and body length measures 9.5–12 cm (3.7–4.7 in), the tail length measures 1–1.8 cm (0.39–0.71 in) and the forearm length is about 7.5–8.5 cm (3.0–3.3 in).

== Distribution and habitat ==
Leschenault's rousette is found in southern Asia where it occurs in Pakistan, India, Nepal, Bhutan, Sri Lanka, Bangladesh, Myanmar, Thailand, Cambodia, Laos, Vietnam, southern China (including Macau and Hong Kong), Peninsular Malaysia, and Sumatra, Java, Bali and the Mentawai Islands in Indonesia. In Nepal it has been recorded up to 2,000 m (6,600 ft) in altitude. This bat is found in a variety of habitats, from moist tropical forest to towns and cities.

== Biology ==
Leschenault's rousette is a fruit eater which occasionally feeds on small fishes. These bats roost in caves and in abandoned buildings and other human constructed sites, they have been timed to leave their roosts 45 minutes after sunset. They sometimes join mixed roosts with other bat species. The males may roost solitarily among the leaves of trees. The females give birth twice a year to a single pup. In the Himalayas these bats undergo altitudinal migration, moving downhill in the winter. Leschenault's rousette echolocate using clicks created by moving the tongue against the palate, these clicks range in frequency between 60 amd 12 kHz. with most energy at around 18 kHz.
