= Ansell's epauletted fruit bat =

Conservation status
- Data Deficient (IUCN 3.1)

Scientific classification
- Domain: Eukaryota
- Kingdom: Animalia
- Phylum: Chordata
- Class: Mammalia
- Order: Chiroptera
- Family: Pteropodidae
- Genus: Epomophorus
- Species: E. anselli

Binomial name
- Epomophorus anselli Bergmans & van Strien, 2004
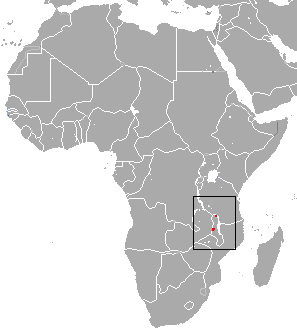
- Ansell's epauletted fruit bat range

Species of bat

Ansell's epauletted fruit bat (Epomophorus anselli) is a species of megabat in the family Pteropodidae.

== Taxonomy and etymology ==
It was described as a new species in 2004. The holotype was collected in 1982 in Kasungu National Park, Malawi at 1,000 m (3,300 ft) above sea level. The eponym for the species name "anselli" is W. F. H. Ansell (d. 1996) "for his important contributions to the mammalogy of Malawi and other African countries."

== Description ==
Its forearm length is approximately 77.4 mm (3.05 in). Its snout is long and narrow. Very little is known about its reproduction, as only a few individuals have been documented. However, a female was collected in mid-May that was classified as "nearly adult."

== Range and status ==
It has only been recorded in Malawi. Its range includes the miombo woodland. In 2016, it was evaluated as a data deficient species by the IUCN. There are very few occurrence records for this species; its geographic range, population trend, and ecological requirements are unknown. When describing the species in 2004, the authors stated that there was "no reason to believe that the species is in any danger [of extinction]", despite its infrequent documentation.
