= Philippine dawn bat =

Conservation status
- Vulnerable (IUCN 3.1)

Scientific classification
- Kingdom: Animalia
- Phylum: Chordata
- Class: Mammalia
- Order: Chiroptera
- Family: Pteropodidae
- Genus: Eonycteris
- Species: E. robusta

Binomial name
- Eonycteris robusta Miller, 1913
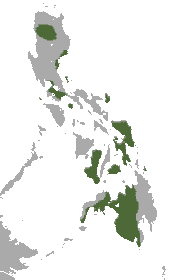
- Philippine dawn bat range

Species of bat

The Philippine dawn bat (Eonycteris robusta) is a species of megabat in the family Pteropodidae endemic to the Philippines. It is associated with lowland forest and cave roosts, and is threatened by habitat and roost disturbance. It is assessed as Vulnerable by the IUCN.

== Distribution and habitat ==
The Philippine dawn bat occurs on multiple Philippine islands, including Luzon, Polillo, Lubang, Marinduque, Catanduanes, Samar, Maripipi, Biliran, Leyte, Negros, Bohol, Siargao, and Mindanao. It inhabits largely undisturbed primary lowland forest as well as some secondary and disturbed forest habitats, and day roosts in caves, particularly limestone caves. Its main reported pressures are deforestation and cave disturbance.
