= Comoro rousette =

Conservation status
- Vulnerable (IUCN 3.1)

Scientific classification
- Kingdom: Animalia
- Phylum: Chordata
- Class: Mammalia
- Order: Chiroptera
- Family: Pteropodidae
- Genus: Rousettus
- Species: R. obliviosus

Binomial name
- Rousettus obliviosus Kock, 1978
- Comoro rousette range

Species of bat

The Comoro rousette (Rousettus obliviosus) is a species of megabat in the family Pteropodidae endemic to the Comoros Islands. Its natural habitats are subtropical or tropical moist lowland forests, caves, plantations, and urban areas.

== Discovery and Taxonomy ==
Rousettus obliviosus was described by the German mammalogist Dieter Kock in 1978. It was previously thought to be a subspecies of Rousettus madagascariensis however this was not supported by later genetic analysis.

The type series of R. obliviosus consists of thirteen specimens of various ages and sexes collected from Anjouan and Grand Comore.

== Habitat and Ecology ==
The Comoro rousette is found on Grande Comore, Mohéli, and Anjouan, but has not been sited in Mayotte. The species roosts in both deep and shallow caves and under rock shelters. The species often nests in lava tube caves; Goodman et al. have suggested that its absence from Mayotte despite seemingly suitable habitat, may be due to a lack of these caves; Mayotte is the oldest of the four islands and many of the caves have collapsed.

Based on observations and evaluation of ejecta pellets the species is known to feed on fruits, flowers, and leaves. It is known to consume non native plant species including non-native papayas, kapok trees, and bananas/plantains.

The Comoro rousette is parasitized by the nycterbiid bat fly Eucampsipoda theodori.

== Morphology ==
The Comoro rousette is one of the smallest of the nine Rousettus species, with an average forearm length of 7.4cm and an average weight of 44g. It is a dull gray-brown with a fox-like face, "squarish" teeth, and a relatively long tail. It exhibits very little sexual dimorphism, though males may be slightly larger than females.

== Behavior ==
The Comoro rousette lives in colonies ranging in size from 100 to several thousand individuals. It vocalizes loudly while roosting. R. obliviosus has been known to roost sympatrically with the micro-bat Miniopterus griveaudi.

Like other members of the Rousettus genus, R. oblivious appears to use echolocation, an unusual feature among megachiropterans.

It displays fast, erratic flight and is able to hover for brief periods. It is most active at dusk and during the night.

Little is known about the reproductive behavior of the species, though lactating and parous females and young bats have been observed in July. Interestingly, an embryo was recorded October, suggesting that the species may be polyestrous or may employ a pre- or post-copulatory delay mechanism as a reproductive strategy.

== Interactions with humans ==
R. obliviosus may be more tolerant to deforestation than some other megachiropteran species due to its ability to forage in agricultural areas and may even benefit from the replacement of native forest by fruit tree plantations.

R. obliviosus is not commonly eaten by humans, however Sewall et al. reported that children in Bandakalala sometimes hunt Comoro rousettes for sport.
