= Greater nectar bat =

Conservation status
- Near Threatened (IUCN 3.1)

Scientific classification
- Kingdom: Animalia
- Phylum: Chordata
- Class: Mammalia
- Order: Chiroptera
- Family: Pteropodidae
- Genus: Eonycteris
- Species: E. major

Binomial name
- Eonycteris major K. Andersen, 1910
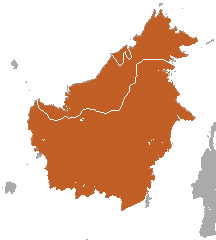
- Greater nectar bat range

Species of bat

The greater nectar bat or greater dawn bat (Eonycteris major) is a species of megabat within the genus Eonycteris. It is found in Brunei, Indonesia, Malaysia, and the Philippines. Its range is limited and includes Luzon to Maripipi in the Philippines and scattered parts of Borneo including Tuaran and Ranau in Sabah; Bau, Kuching and Bintulu in Sarawak.

== Biology and ecology ==
All E. major were mist-netted in sites associated with flowering banana plants (Musa species) found on the edge between primary forest and open or secondary habitats. An individual that was netted and banded at 22:05 on 5 July 1996 was recaptured in another net the following night at 18:50 about 30 m away. This may suggest of stable food resources at the edge or lack of feeding sites elsewhere. The area surrounding Tawau Park is covered with oil palm plantations or disturbed habitats. This species usually roosts in caves and hollow trees, but there is little other information on the ecology of this species .

== Description ==
At Tawau Hills in Sabah, a pregnant female had a forearm length of 81 millimetres (3.2 in) and weighed 103 grams (3.6 oz), another female weighed 94 grams (3.3 oz) while a lactating female with a forearm length of 78 millimetres (3.1 in) weighed 87.5 grams (3.09 oz). The measurements were consistent with those reported previously elsewhere.
