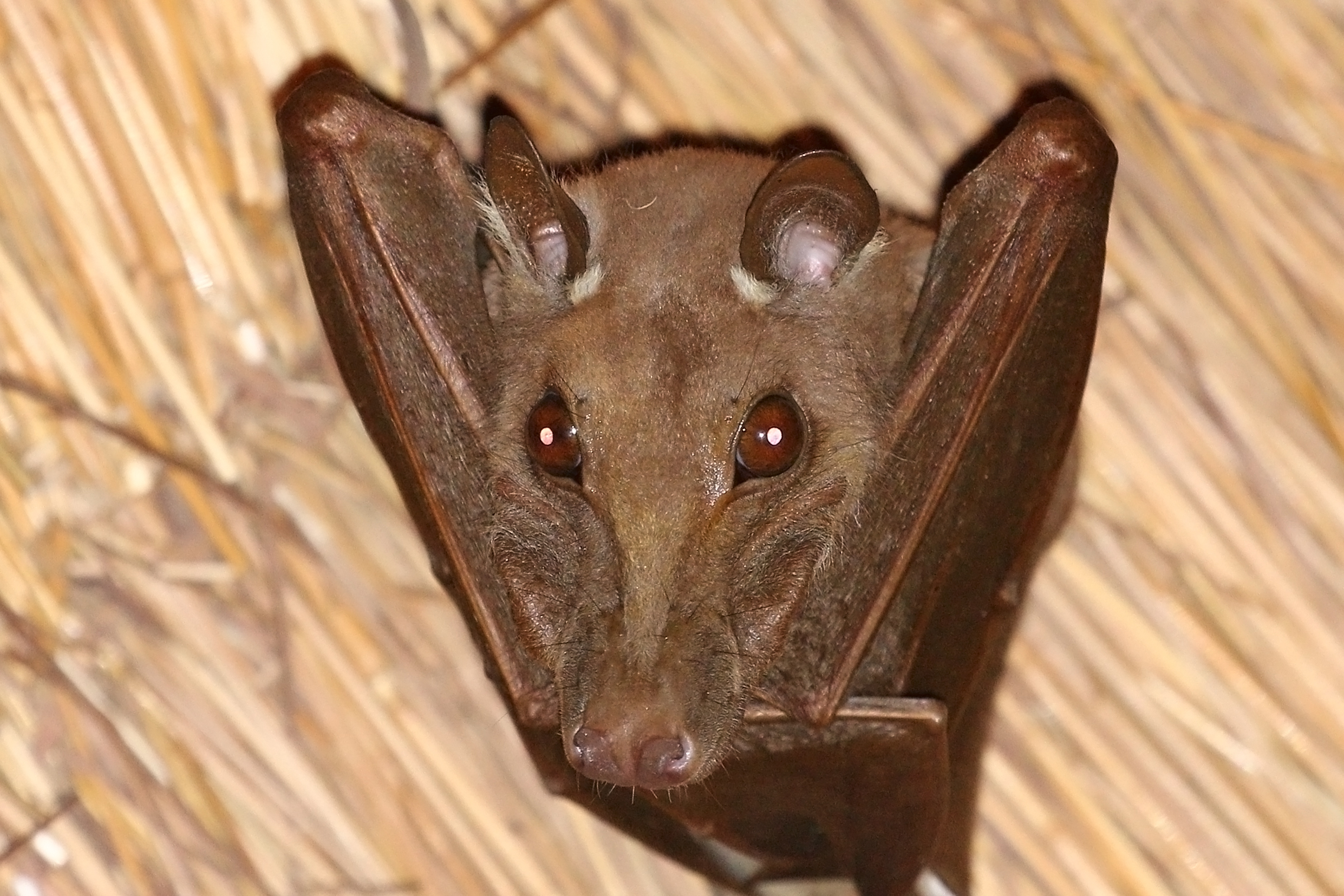

Conservation status
- Least Concern (IUCN 3.1)

Scientific classification
- Kingdom: Animalia
- Phylum: Chordata
- Class: Mammalia
- Order: Chiroptera
- Family: Pteropodidae
- Genus: Epomophorus
- Species: E. gambianus

Binomial name
- Epomophorus gambianus (Ogilby, 1835)
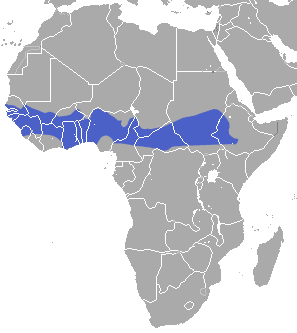
- Gambian epauletted fruit bat range

Synonyms
- Pteropus gambianus Ogilby, 1835

= Gambian epauletted fruit bat =

Species of bat

The Gambian epauletted fruit bat (Epomophorus gambianus) is a species of megabat in the family Pteropodidae. It is found in Benin, Burkina Faso, Cameroon, Central African Republic, Chad, Democratic Republic of the Congo, Ivory Coast, Ethiopia, Gambia, Ghana, Guinea, Guinea-Bissau, Liberia, Mali, Niger, Nigeria, Senegal, Sierra Leone, South Sudan, Sudan, and Togo. Its natural habitats are subtropical or tropical dry forests and savanna.

Populations of epauletted fruit bats are threatened by pesticides on fruit, human disturbance and over-collecting in the past. However, the number one reason it may be threatened is habitat destruction.

Mostly found in Africa, these creatures have grayish-brown color fur with a white patch at the base of their ear in both males and females. These fruit bats are also very noisy creatures. In the context of mating behavior (see "Reproduction" below), adult males may hang from perches and perform a calling-display during which they utter a moderately loud bell like 'ping' at intervals of 1–3 seconds.

It is very easy to tell the male fruit bat from the female fruit bat. In comparison, males are usually larger than females. The males also have gland-like pouches in the skin of their shoulder, that is surrounded by light colored patches and/or tufts of fur. Thus, one of the reasons why they are named Gambian epauletted fruit bats, it produces the effect of epaulettes; a decorative or ornamental piece. The only way one would be able to see the epaulettes is when the male becomes stressed or sexually stimulated. Both males and females have small rounded ears, with a dog-like muzzle.

Their head and body length are usually 125–250 mm (5–10 in) and their wing span is about 508 mm (20 in) for the males. Mass ranges from 40 to 120 g (1.4 to 4.2 oz) and forearms are about 60–100 mm (2–4 in). This creature also has a tail that is hard to detect beneath the inter femoral membrane.

The species is known to hang off of evergreen trees during the day alone or spread out from one another and travel in packs of hundreds during the late hours of the night in the forest of Africa.

== Behavior ==
The Gambian epauletted fruit bats are frugivorous and will appear wherever fig, mango, guava or banana trees are in fruit. The social behavior within fruit-bat camps does not stop at individual family groups. The whole colony is organized, with separate peripheral groups of immatures and non-breeding adults. The epauletted fruit bats travel in small groups of six to twenty bats. When the fruit bats are in flight, they remain together in long processions. The leaders often change, yet they retain the same direction of flight.

They frequently sniff at each other's scent glands to establish personal recognition. Which represents high levels of social organization. When one is shot down, they show great concern and gather round swooping low to inspect it; a sign of affinity rather than totally independent behaviour. They roost during the day in mango trees and bamboo reeds or other trees. The Gambian epauletted fruit bats hang upside down alone or in groups up to twenty. The species' droppings support whole ecosystems of unique organisms, including bacteria useful in detoxifying wastes, and producing gasohol. This species feeds on nectar and fruits of many West African trees, presumably acting as pollinator and/or seed disperser. Some flowering trees depend on the bats for pollination. The pack moves during sunset in large flocks from resting areas to feeding areas. To avoid predators, the bats will carry fruit away from the tree before eating. Over several nights bats may carry more than a ton of seeds from a single wild fig tree, dramatically increasing the number of seedlings that will survive in new locations. The fruit bats spend over half their lives roosting in various places.

On the outskirts of the camp, non-territorial males act as guards. They are alert to the slightest disturbance. They perform a visual inspection and either give a loud alarm signal, or remain still, keeping an eye open.

The Gambian epauletted fruit bats are unlike other bats because they use sight rather than echolocation to find food. They also rely heavily on their smell because they use it to locate food and establish bonds with one another.

== Diet ==
These bats primarily eat small fruits, often found flying from tree to tree, feeding on their primary food source, the fig. However, the fig is not a nutritious food source, due to its low amounts of protein and high amounts of sugar, but it is abundant, so the bats must cover a large number of trees to receive the nutrition necessary to sustain flight and feed their young. However, these bats are not limited to eating just figs. They have also been known to feed on bananas, mangoes, guavas, and the nectar from Parkia biglobosa flowers. Despite this, figs are the primary food source because they are in bloom longer than the rest. The epauletted fruit bat has been known to spend eight to ten hours flying around from tree to tree eating because they burn more energy flying than they receive from the figs.

It is very important that these bats spend so much time getting food because if they don't, then they will not have enough nutrients to give to their young and their babies will not survive. The young do stay in the nest while the parents retrieve the food, but instead, hang on to its mother's teats in flight. This is only until about five weeks, when the bat begins to learn to fly and sheds its milk teeth.

== Reproduction ==
The Gambian epauletted fruit bats show sexual dimorphism. The males of these species are usually larger than the females and in addition possess glandular pouches in the skin of the shoulder which are surrounded by light colored tufts of hair. These produce the effect of epaulets, and are how the species received its name.

The species have more than one mate at a time. The males emit mating calls during the breeding season; which is around April to May and October to November.

Males fly at night to different locations to mate. There, they begin courting calls which attract the females. While making their mating calls, males will flash snowy white patches of fur on their shoulders, called epaulets, which are usually concealed. Because they do this at night, the large white furs are more visible under the lighting conditions.

The gestation period usually lasts about six months, and pregnant females will roost apart from the males. There is usually one young per birth.

Although fertilization ensues immediately after mating, there is little development of the embryo. The delay in embryonic development ensures that birth coincides with a season when food is abundant enough to maintain lactating females, which have a high demand for energy. The delay in embryonic development also permits mating to take place when both males and females are in prime physical condition and have access to good supplies of food.

Newborns grow rapidly, with various parts of their bodies growing at different rates. At birth, the thumbs and hind feet are almost adult size, and grow very little. However, the forearm and other bones supporting the wing enlarge quickly, producing a wing area in adults that is 10 times the size at birth. They rapidly gain weight until they are weaned. But once they begin to eat fruit instead of their mother's milk, their body weight decrease and they use up the fat reserve they have built up during nursing.

At birth the species are equipped with distinctive milk teeth that appear to be useless as tools for eating solid food, but help them attach to their mother's teats. The shedding of milk teeth and the emergence of permanent teeth occurs at about the same time as the bats learn to fly and begin to eat fruit.

The lifespan of this bat is long for being such a small mammal. Most epauletted fruit bats can live up to 28 years, and average about 21 years. The mechanism for such a long life in bats is not known with certainty. Some suggest the longevity in bats is related to the calpain content of neurons.

== Habitat ==
Fruit bats are tropical animals, but some species live in areas with only a limited fruiting season, as in east Africa where the Gambian epauletted fruit bat might feed on figs during the rainy season but in the semi-arid conditions of the rest of the year may have to fly several hundred miles to find a different climate where other trees are still in fruit.

The epauletted fruit bat's geographic range is from southern Zaire and Tanzania to eastern South Africa, and southern Sudan and Ethiopia to Senegal and southern Mali. They are typically a lowland species occurring below 500 meters above sea level, however the Ethiopian populations have been found to occur up to 2,000 meters above sea level. It is native to the countries of Angola, Benin, Botswana, Burkina Faso, Cameroon, Central African Republic, Chad, The Democratic Republic of the Congo, Côte d'Ivoire, Ethiopia, Gambia, Ghana, Guinea, Guinea-Bissau, Liberia, Mali, Namibia, Niger, Nigeria, Senegal, Sierra Leone, Sudan, Togo, Zambia, and Zimbabwe.

As a fairly adaptable species to many types of environments, they can be found in a variety of habitats ranging from the dry savanna, moist savanna, mosaic, bushland, tropical dry forests, and subtropical dry forests habitats. They have also been reported to inhabit areas of partially degraded forest, mangrove, and swamp forest habitats. This species of bats prefer to live on the edge of forests and they tend to roost in places ranging from thick foliage, accumulated roots along stream banks, below the thatch of open sheds, and large tree hollows.

The species also tend to roost in small groups or as individuals. They can also roost low in trees during the day, undisturbed by the presence of people and even within areas that receive considerable light. These bats have been known to have a presence in agricultural areas with orchards of bananas, figs, mangoes, guavas, and other fruits. They have made the move to human areas due to encroachment by humans into their natural habitats.
