= Linduan rousette =

Conservation status
- Data Deficient (IUCN 3.1)

Scientific classification
- Kingdom: Animalia
- Phylum: Chordata
- Class: Mammalia
- Order: Chiroptera
- Family: Pteropodidae
- Genus: Rousettus
- Species: R. linduensis

Binomial name
- Rousettus linduensis Maryanto & Yani, 2003
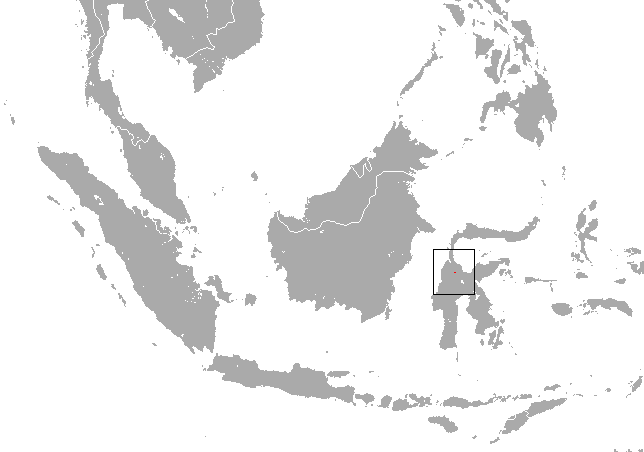
- Linduan rousette range

Species of megabat

The Linduan rousette (Rousettus linduensis) is a species of megabat in the Rousettus genus of the family Pteropodidae. It is endemic to Indonesia and is known only from four specimens collected in the swamp forest of Lore Lindu National Park, in central Sulawesi. It was first described in 2003.
