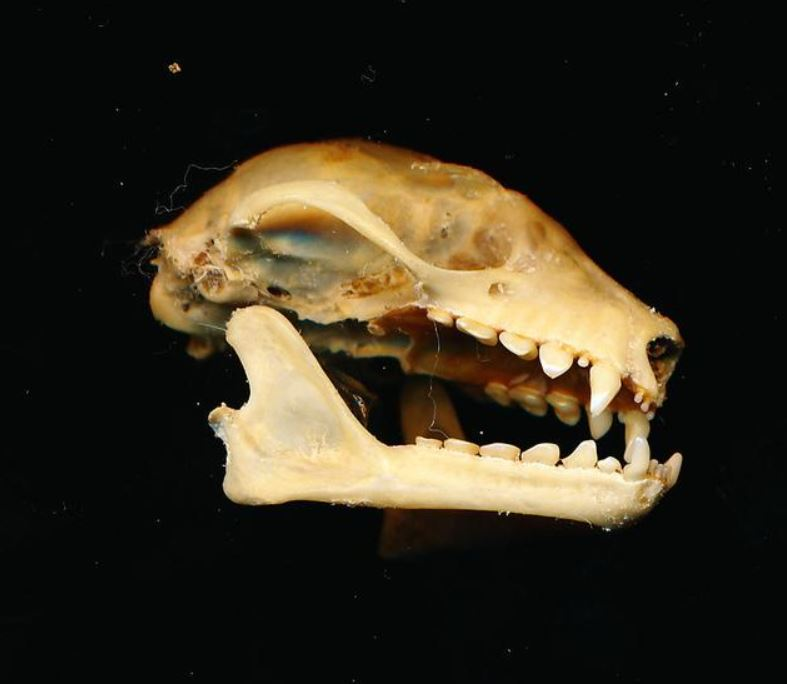

Conservation status
- Vulnerable (IUCN 3.1)

Scientific classification
- Kingdom: Animalia
- Phylum: Chordata
- Class: Mammalia
- Order: Chiroptera
- Family: Pteropodidae
- Genus: Rousettus
- Species: R. spinalatus

Binomial name
- Rousettus spinalatus Bergmans & Hill, 1980
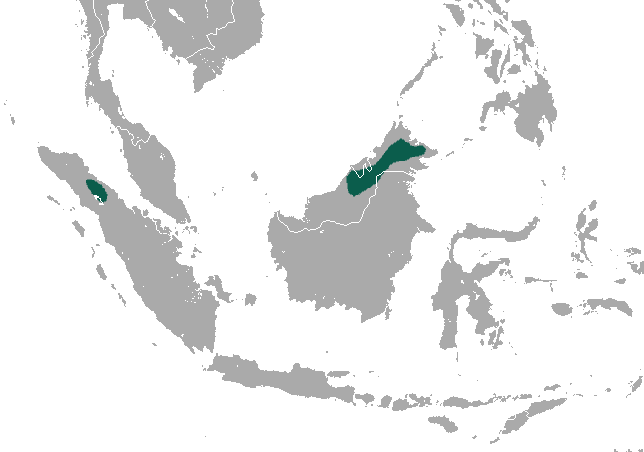
- Bare-backed rousette range

= Bare-backed rousette =

Species of bat

The bare-backed rousette (Rousettus spinalatus) is a species of megabat.

== Taxonomy and etymology ==
It was described as a new species in 1980 by Bergmans and Hill. The holotype was collected in 1977 in northern Sumatra. The species name "spinulatus" is from Latin spina meaning "spine" and ala meaning "wing;" the scientific name refers to the fact that the wings insert along the spine rather than the sides of the body, which is unique in the genus Rousettus.

== Description ==
The bare-backed rousette is a small megabat with a cone-shaped snout. Its face has a number of small warts on its chin, around its mouth, and between its upper lip and eyes. Its wings are short and broad. Its forearm length is approximately 83–89 mm (3.3–3.5 in). Individuals weigh 88–94 g (3.1–3.3 oz).

== Biology ==
It is nocturnal, roosting in sheltered places during the day such as caves. They navigate and potentially locate food resources using a primitive form of echolocation. They create high-pitched buzzing calls by moving the tongue against the palate. Food sources may include nectar and fruit, though it is alleged that they eat edible-nest swiftlet eggs and hatchlings, causing damage to the economically valuable nests.

== Range and habitat ==
Its range includes Indonesia and Malaysia. It is found at elevations up to 300 m (980 ft) above sea level.

== Conservation ==
As of 2008, it is evaluated as a vulnerable species by the IUCN.
