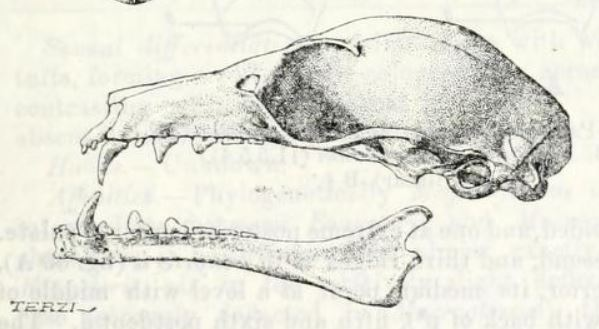

Conservation status
- Least Concern (IUCN 3.1)

Scientific classification
- Kingdom: Animalia
- Phylum: Chordata
- Class: Mammalia
- Order: Chiroptera
- Family: Pteropodidae
- Genus: Megaloglossus; Pagenstecher, 1885
- Species: M. woermanni

Binomial name
- Megaloglossus woermanni Pagenstecher, 1885
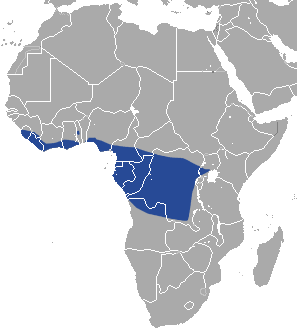
- Woermann's bat range

= Woermann's bat =

Species of mammal

Woermann's bat or Woermann's long-tongued fruit bat (Megaloglossus woermanni) is a species of megabat in the family Pteropodidae. It is monotypic within the genus Megaloglossus. It is found in Angola, Benin, Cameroon, Central African Republic, Republic of the Congo, Democratic Republic of the Congo, Ivory Coast, Equatorial Guinea, Gabon, Ghana, Guinea, Liberia, Nigeria, Sierra Leone, Togo, and Uganda. Its natural habitats are subtropical or tropical moist lowland forests and moist savanna.
