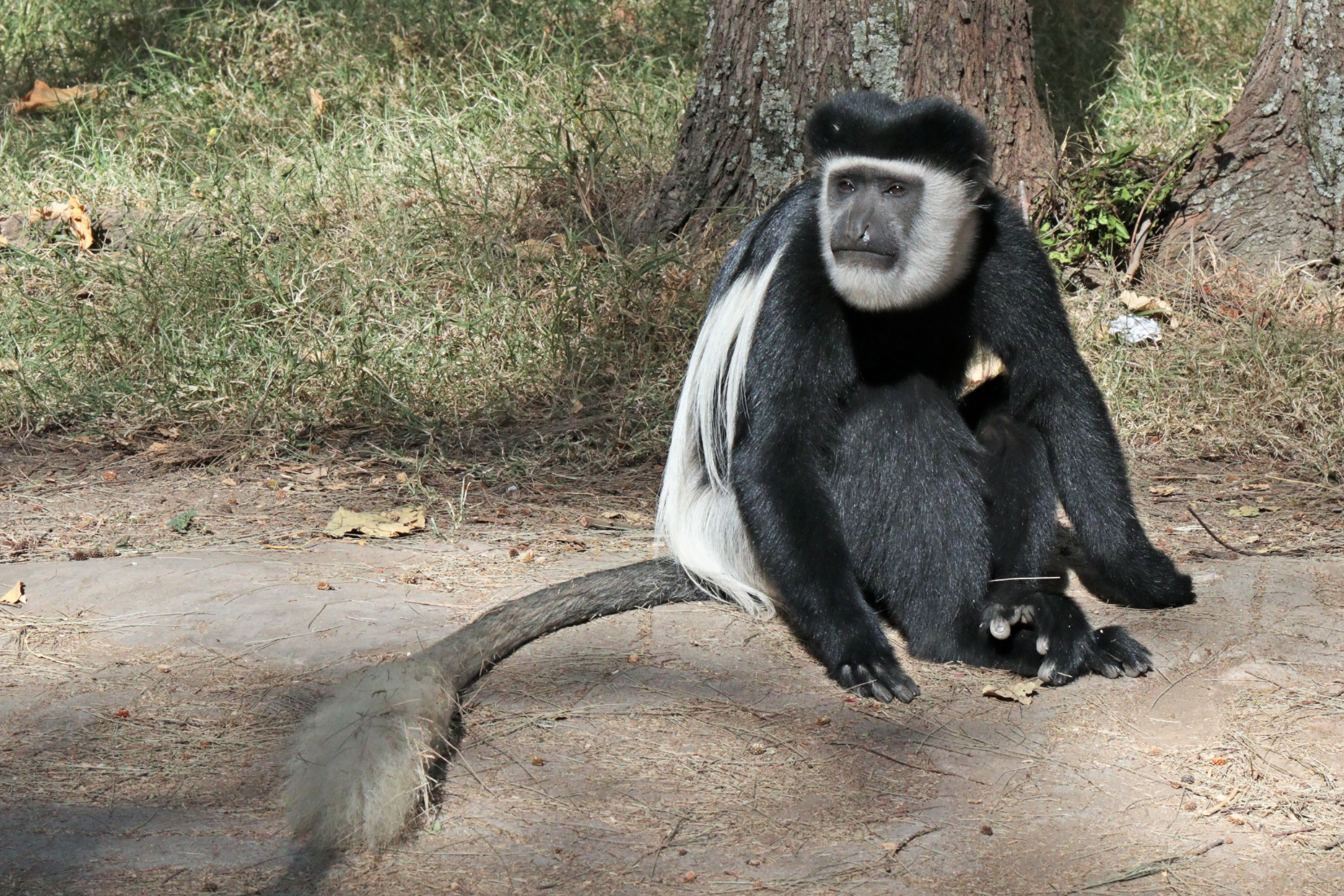
- Male C. g. guereza Awassa, Ethiopia
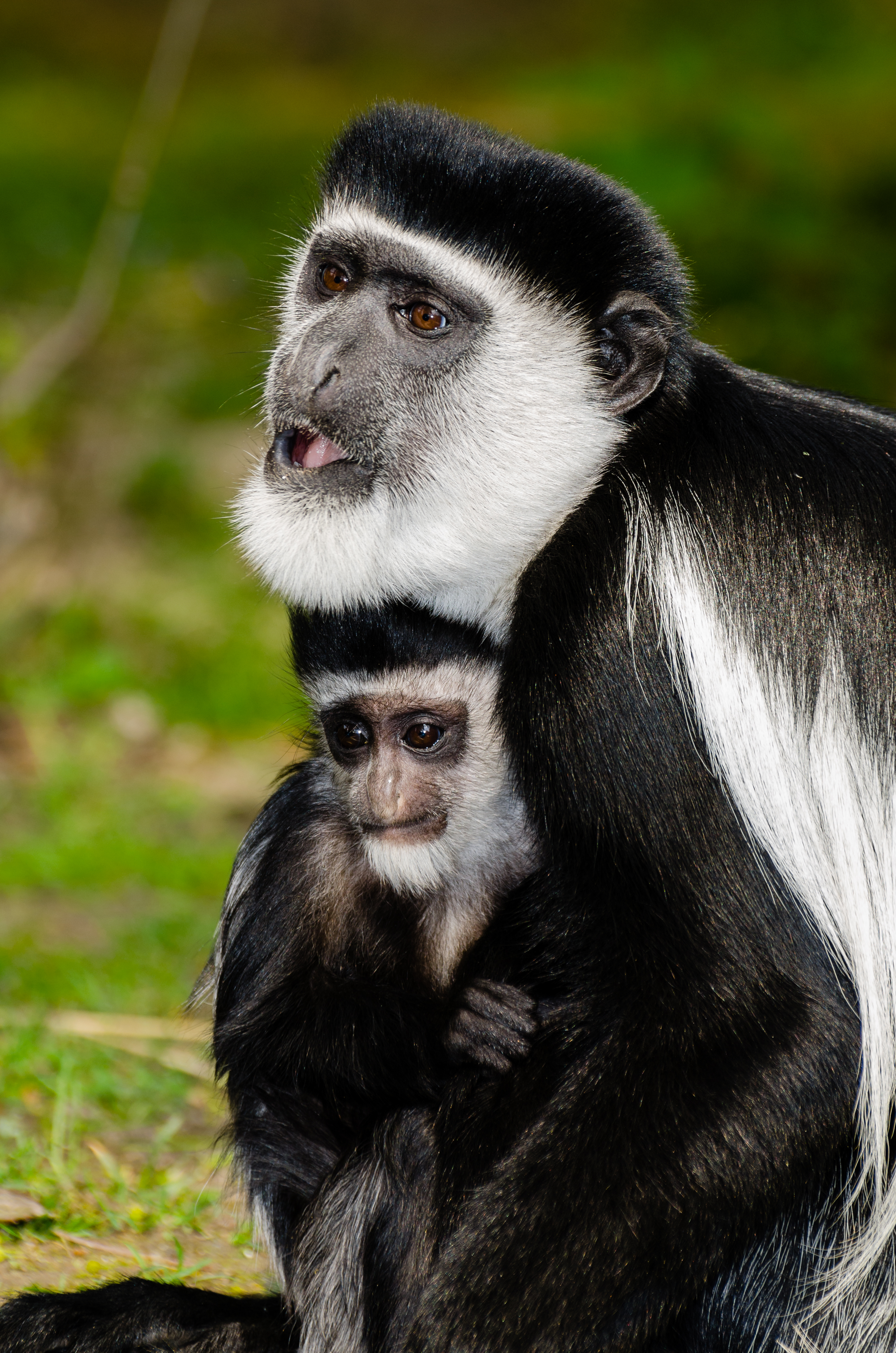
- Female with infant at Münster Zoo

Conservation status
- Least Concern (IUCN 3.1)

Scientific classification
- Kingdom: Animalia
- Phylum: Chordata
- Class: Mammalia
- Order: Primates
- Family: Cercopithecidae
- Genus: Colobus
- Species: C. guereza

Binomial name
- Colobus guereza Rüppell, 1835
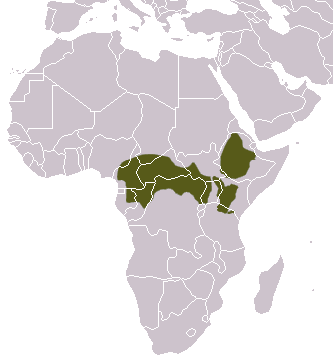
- Mantled guereza range

= Mantled guereza =

Species of mammal

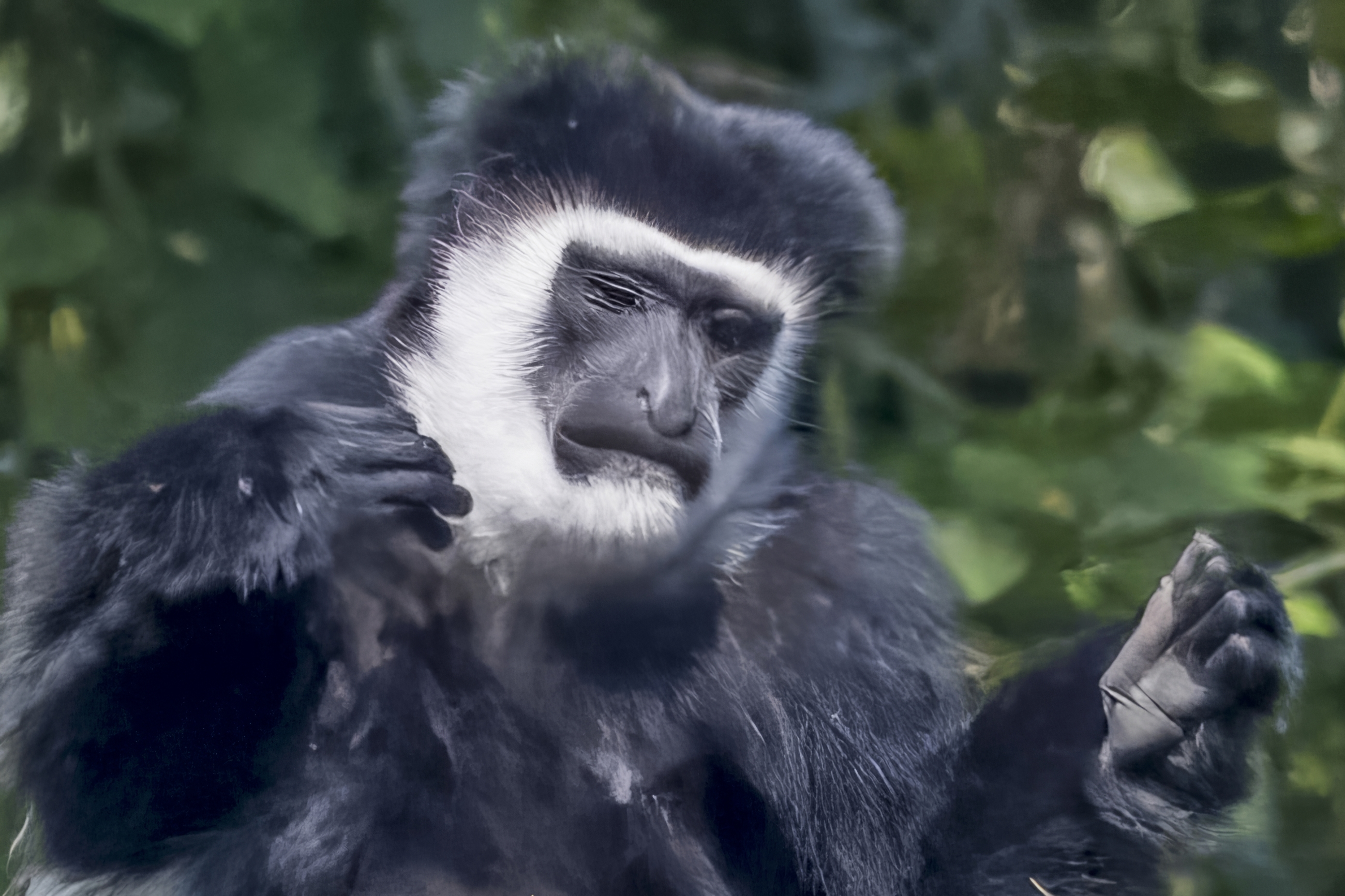
Showing the colobus' hand missing the thumb

The mantled guereza (Colobus guereza), also known simply as the guereza, historically the eastern black-and-white colobus, and Abyssinian black-and-white colobus, is a black-and-white colobus, a type of Old World monkey. It is native to much of west central and east Africa, including Cameroon, Equatorial Guinea, Nigeria, Ethiopia, Kenya, Tanzania, Uganda and Chad. The species consists of several subspecies that differ in appearance. It has a distinctive appearance, which is alluded to in its name; the long white fringes of hair that run along each side of its black trunk are known as a mantle. Its face is framed with white hair and it has a large white tail tuft.

The mantled guereza is diurnal and arboreal, found in both deciduous and evergreen forests. It is an adaptable species that can cope with habitat disturbance and prefers secondary forest close to rivers or lakes. Although previously thought to eat only leaves, it also eats seeds, fruits, and arthropods. It is able to digest plant material with a high fibre content with its specialised stomach and may only eat from a few plant species at a time. It is preyed on by birds of prey and some mammals, such as the common chimpanzee and the leopard.

The mantled guereza lives in social groups of three to fifteen individuals. These groups normally include a dominant male, several females, and the offspring of the females. It has a polygynous mating system and copulation is initiated with vocal communication. After a gestation period of just over five months, infants are born with pink skin and white fur, which darkens to the adult coloration by three to four months. The mantled guereza is well known for its dawn chorus, the males' "roar" is a method of long-distance communication that reinforces territorial boundaries. It also makes other vocalization and uses body postures, movements, and facial expressions to communicate.

The mantled guereza is listed as Least Concern by the International Union for Conservation of Nature (IUCN) because it is widespread—although it is locally threatened in some areas, the decline is not great enough to list it in a higher category of threat. However, one subspecies found in Kenya is listed as Endangered. It can survive well in degraded forests and in some areas it is more common in logged areas than unlogged ones. The mantled guereza is also threatened by hunting for bushmeat and for its skin.

== Etymology ==
The mantled guereza has many alternative common names including the guereza, the eastern black-and-white colobus, the magistrate colobus, or the Abyssinian black-and-white colobus. The name "mantled" refers to its mantle, the long silky white fringes of hair that run along its body and "guereza" is the native name of the monkey in Ethiopia. The scientific name Colobus derives from Greek kolobus meaning "mutilated" which refers to its lack of thumbs.

== Taxonomic classification ==
The mantled guereza was first classified by Eduard Rüppell, a German naturalist and explorer, during his trip to Abyssinia between 1830 and 1834. He wrote about the species in Neue Wirbelthiere con Abyssinien, Saengthiere in 1835. It was first seen in Europe in 1890 in Berlin Zoological Garden when three individuals were purchased from a dealer from Massawa, Eritrea.

Distribution map of subspecies of Mantled guereza

The mantled guereza is in the Colobinae subfamily, also known as the leaf-eating monkeys, a group of Old World monkeys from Asia and Africa. This subfamily is split into three groups, the colobus monkeys of Africa, of which the mantled guereza is a part, the langurs, or leaf monkeys, of Asia, and an "odd-nosed" group. The African colobus monkeys are divided again by distinctions in color, behavior, and ecology. The three genera are the black-and-white colobi, the red colobi, and the olive colobi. There are three black-and-white colobi: the mantled guereza, Colobus guereza, the king colobus, C. polykomos, and the Angola colobus, C. angolensis. Groves lists seven subspecies of mantled guereza in Mammal Species of the World (MSW) (2005). The validity of the Djaffa Mountain guereza, C. g. gallarum, is uncertain, although not listed by Groves in MSW, it is recognised in his 2007 Colobinae review paper, and by International Union for Conservation of Nature (IUCN) assessors Gippolliti and Butynski in 2008.

- Western guereza, Colobus guereza occidentalis, occurs from eastern Nigeria, Cameroon, and Gabon at the edge of its western range to South Sudan and Uganda, west of the Nile.
- Omo River guereza or Abyssinian black-and-white colobus, C. g. guereza, found in Ethiopia, in the highlands west of the Rift Valley down to the reaches of the Awash River, the Omo River, and in the Blue Nile gorge.
- Djaffa Mountains guereza or Neumann's black-and-white colobus, C. g. gallarum, found in the Ethiopian Highlands east of the Rift Valley.
- Dodinga Hills guereza, C. g. dodingae, found in the Didinga Hills in South Sudan.
- Mau Forest guereza, C. g. matschiei, occurs from western Kenya and Uganda south into northern Tanzania.
- Mt Uaraguess guereza or Percival's black-and-white colobus, C. g. percivali, found in the Matthews Range in Kenya.
- Eastern black-and-white colobus, C. g. kikuyuensis, occurs in Kenya on the Ngong Escarpment of Mount Kenya and in the Aberdare Range.
- Kilimanjaro guereza, C. g. caudatus, found in Tanzania and Kenya in the forests surrounding Mount Kilimanjaro and Mount Meru.

The morphological difference between subspecies is most pronounced between the southeastern Kilimanjaro guereza, C. g. caudatus, and the northwestern western guereza, C. g. occidentalis. The intermediate subspecies show a gradual change between the two.

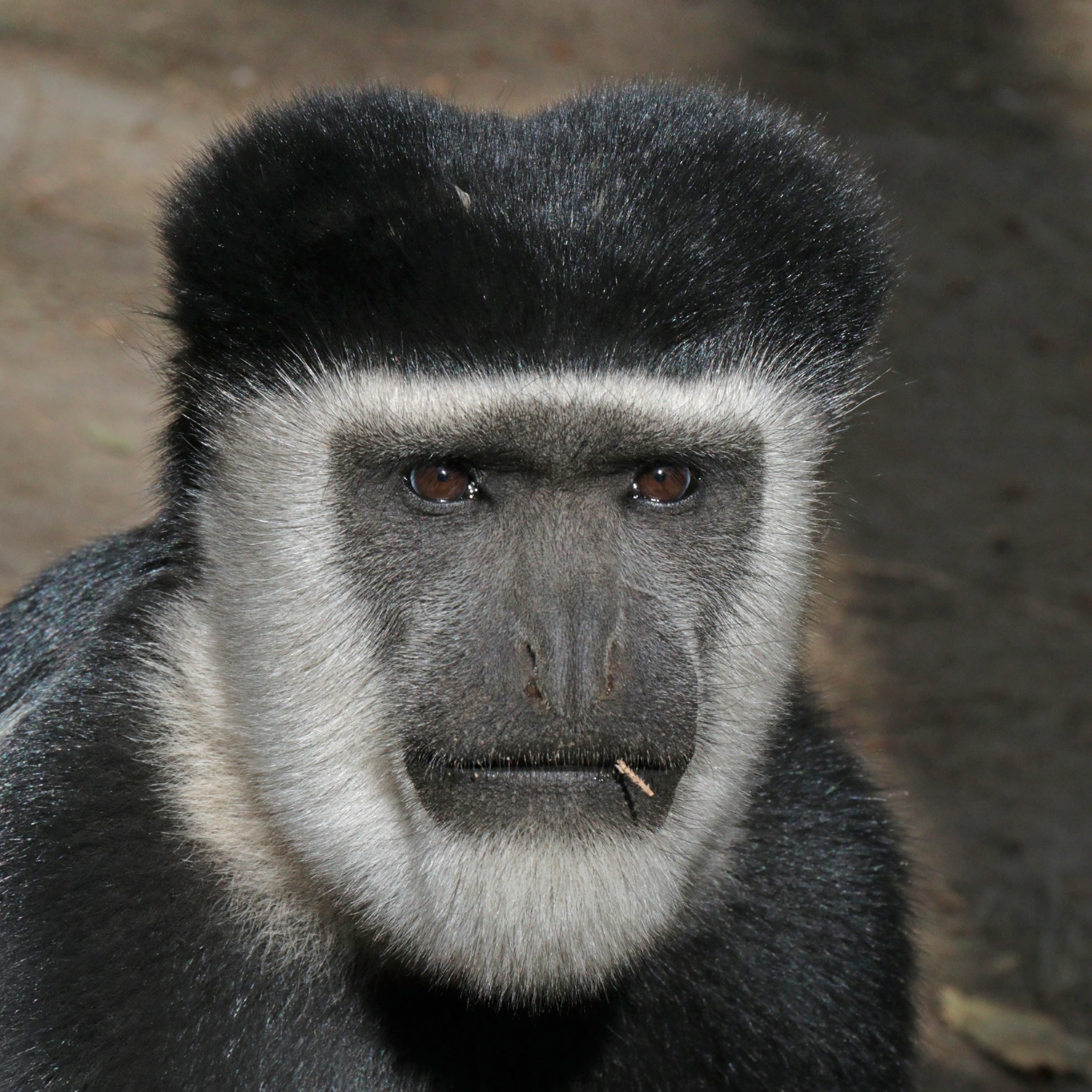
Male C. g. guereza
Awassa, Ethiopia

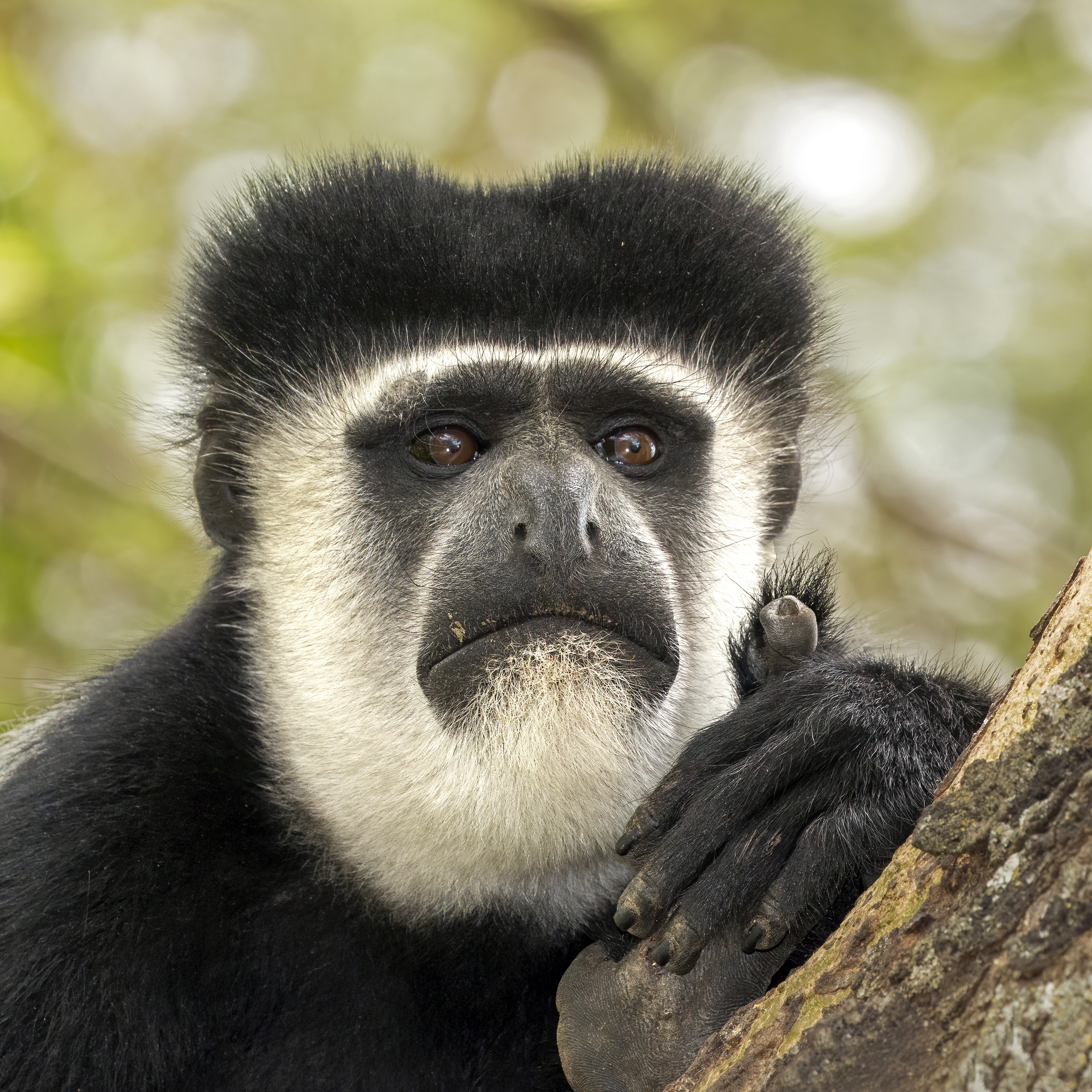
C. g. matschiei
Lake Naivasha, Kenya

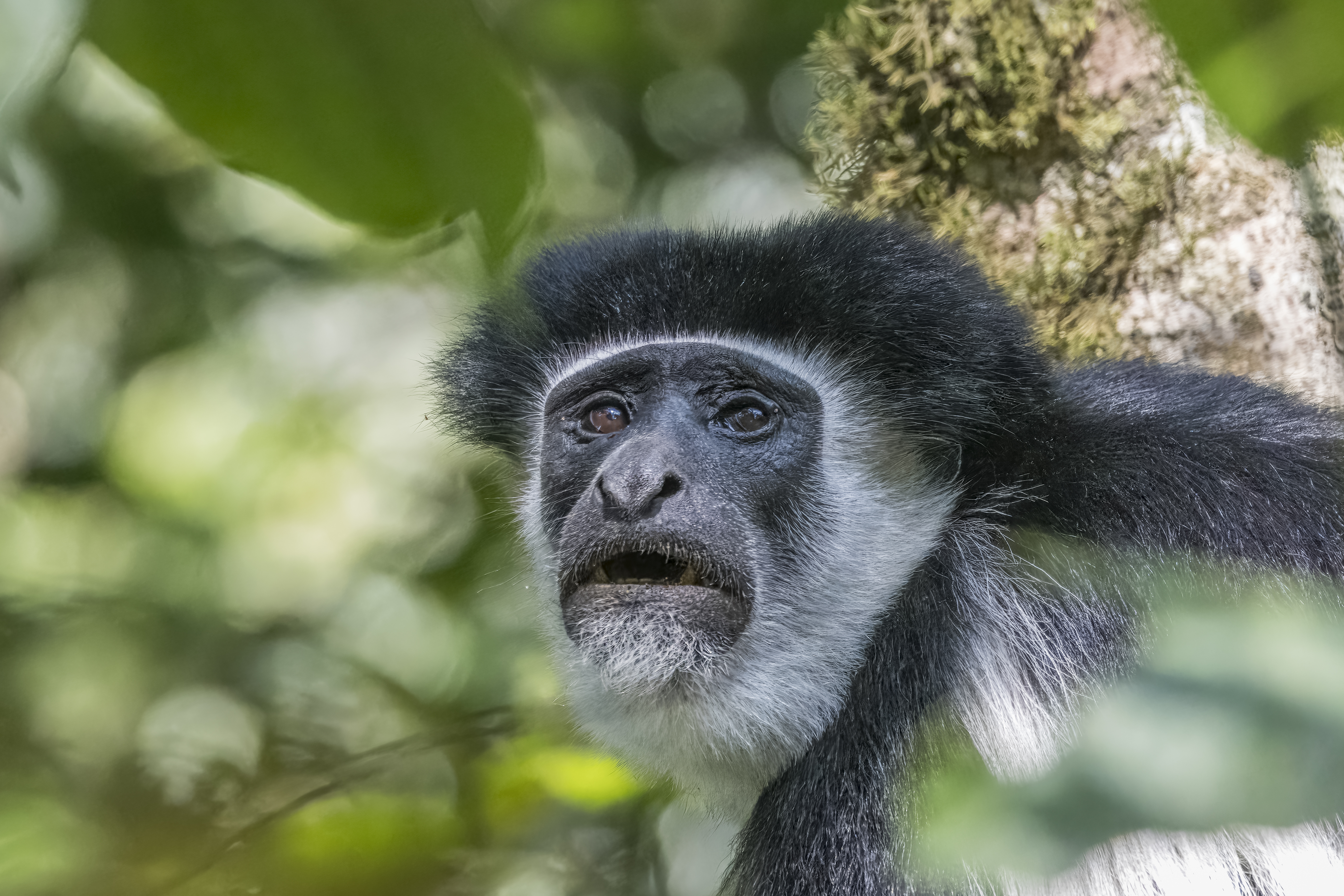
C. g. caudatus
Arusha National Park, Tanzania
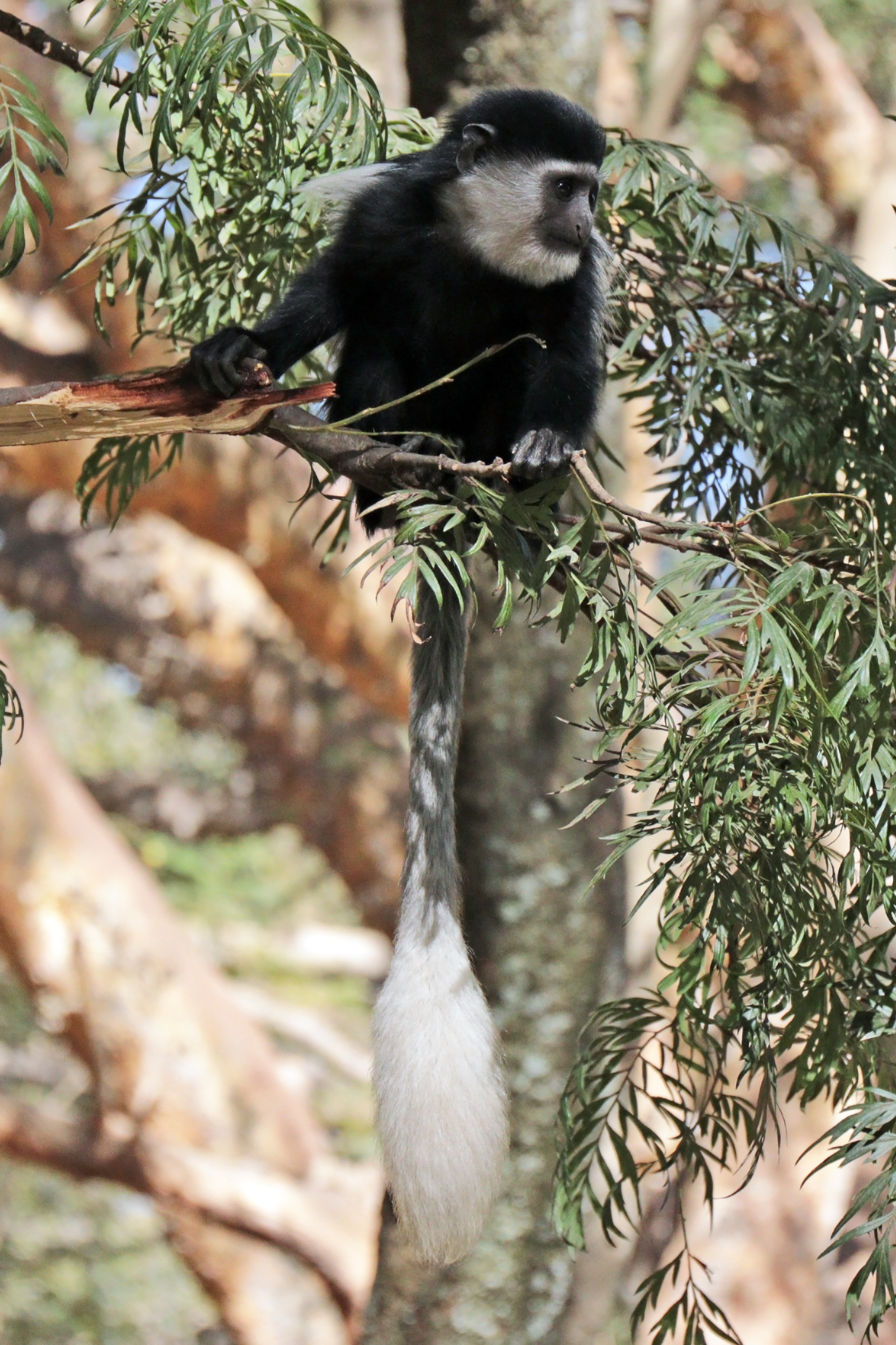
Juvenile female C. g. guereza
Awassa, Ethiopia

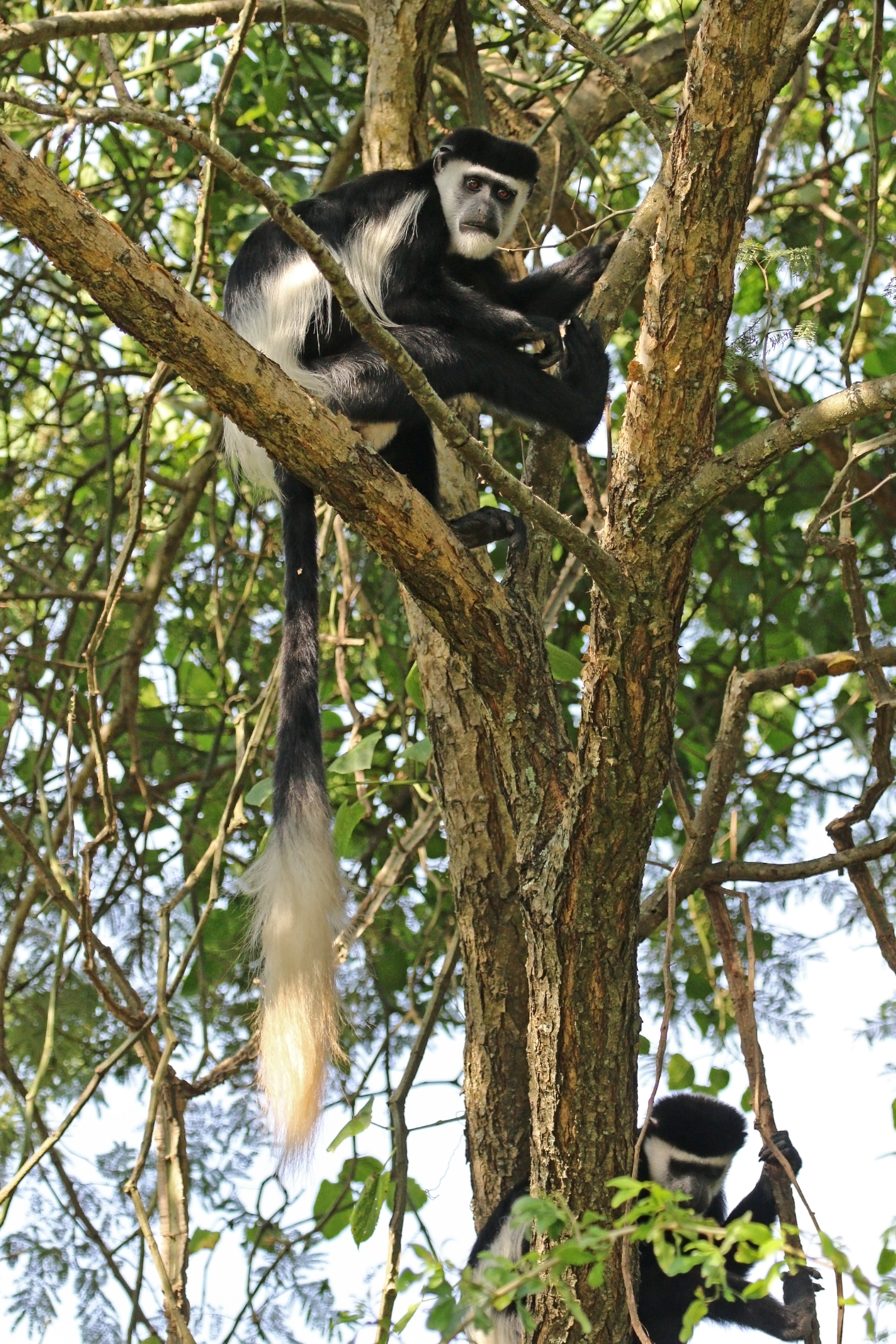
C. g. occidentalis
Semliki Wildlife Reserve, Uganda

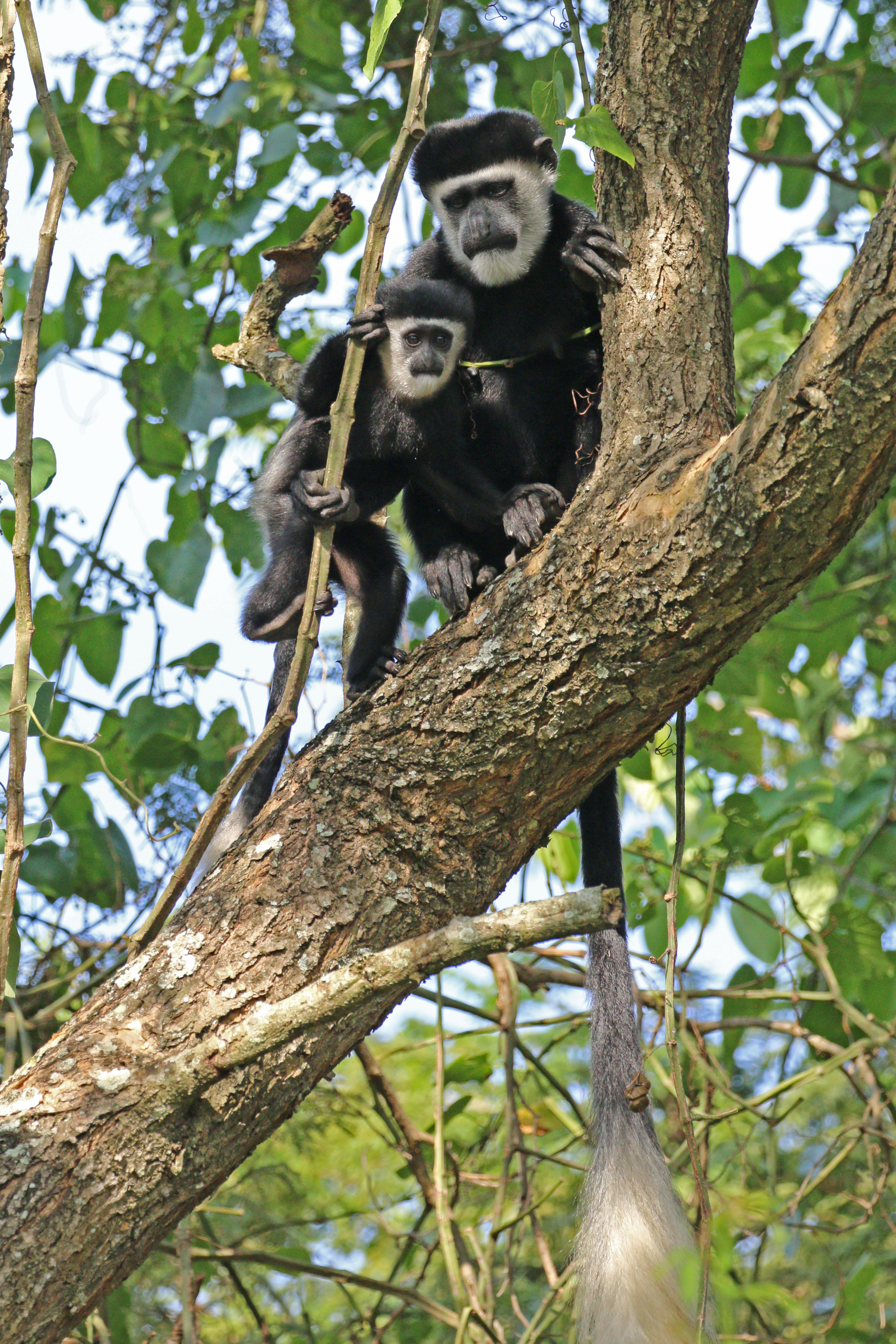
C. g. occidentalis with juvenile
Semliki, Uganda

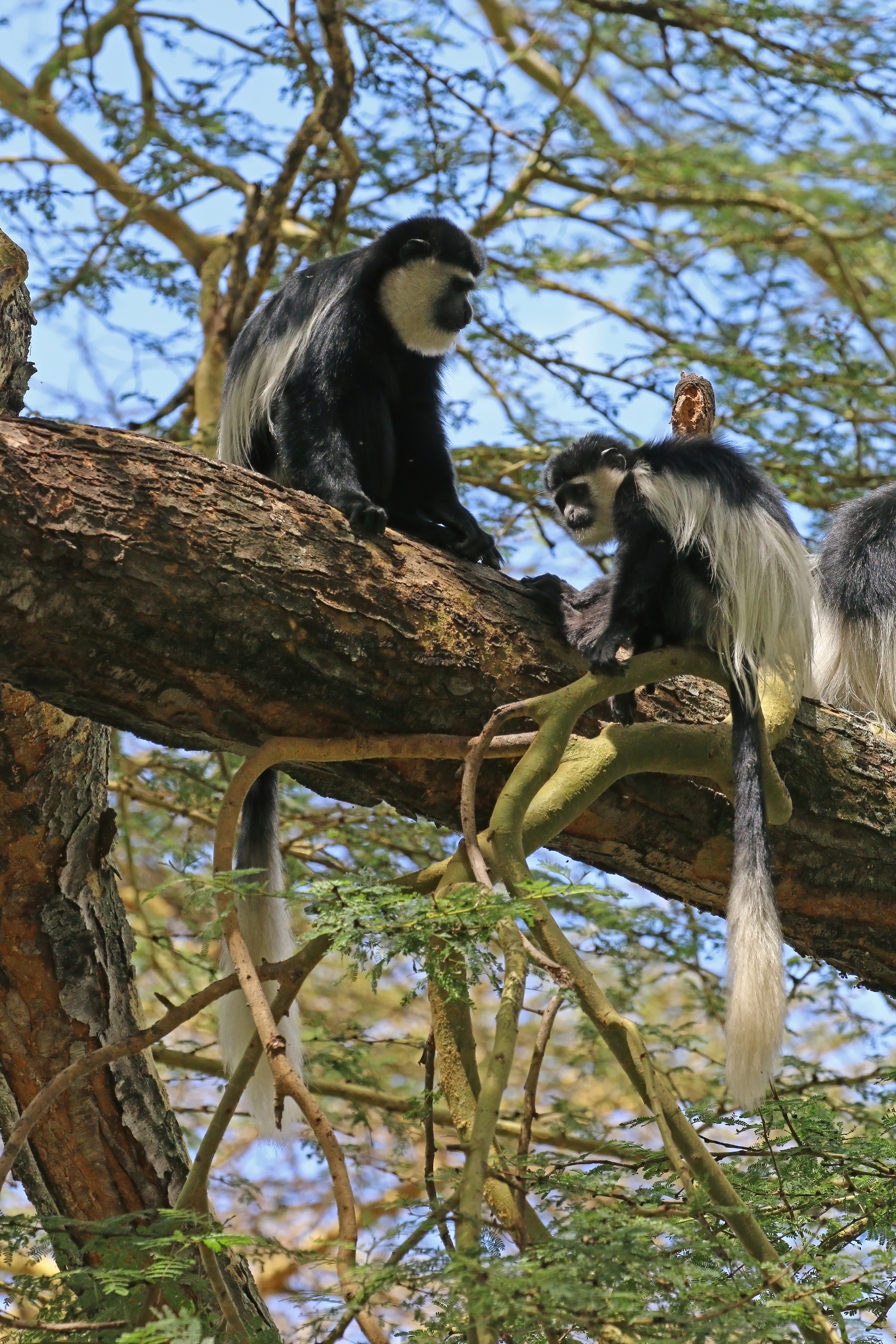
C. g. matschiei with juvenile
Lake Naivasha, Kenya

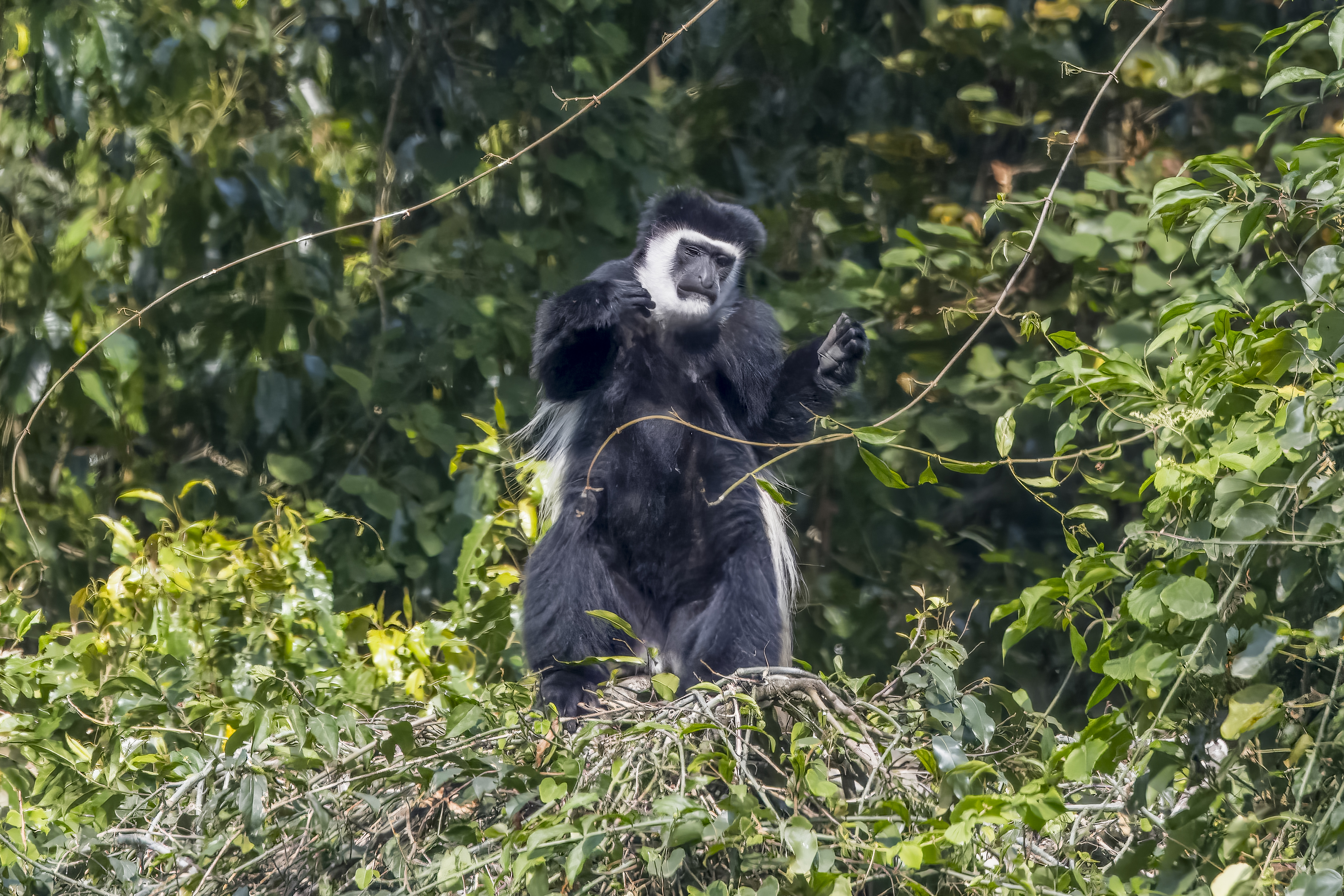
C. g. caudatus standing
Arusha National Park, Tanzania

== Physical description ==
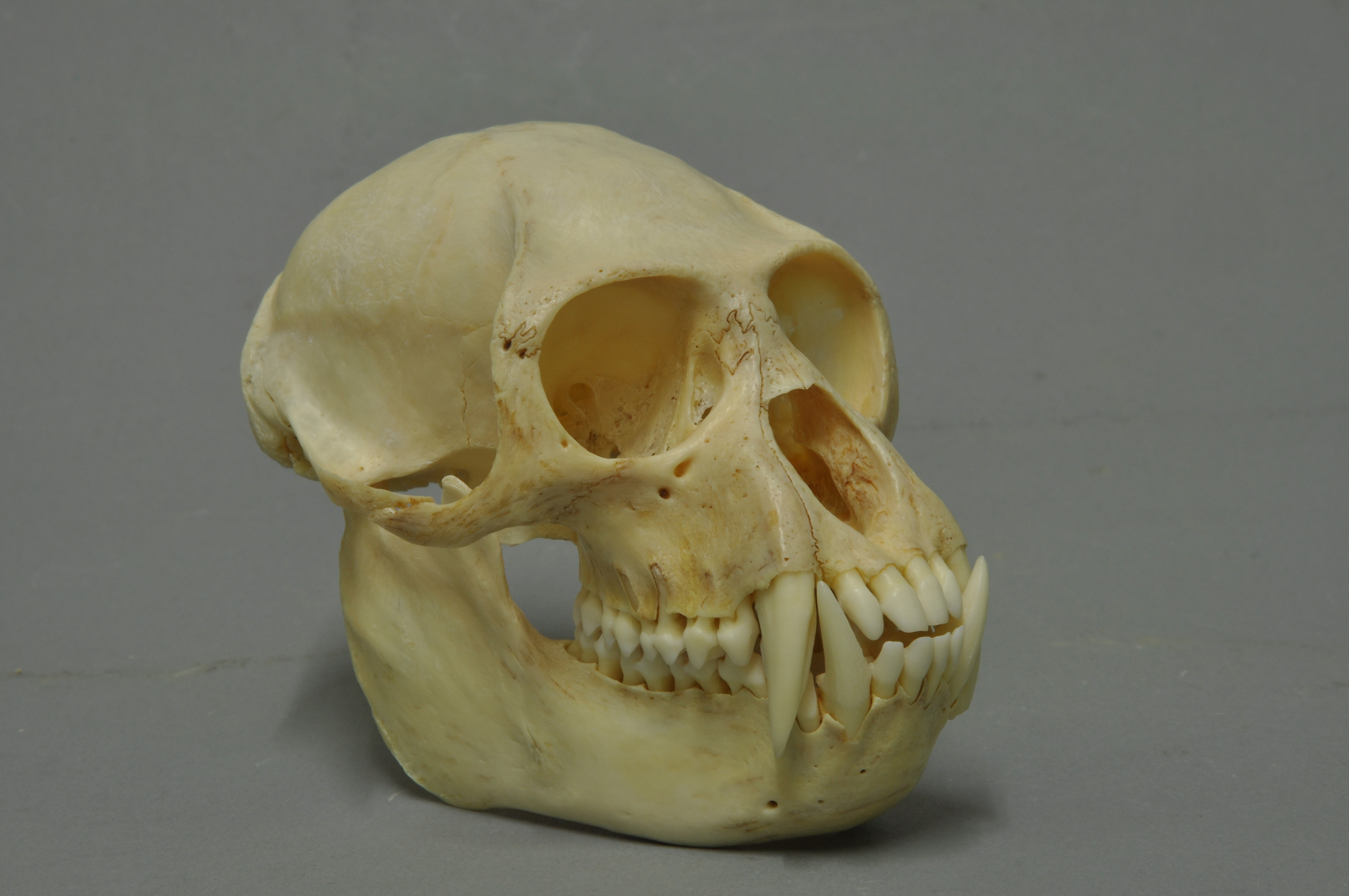
A skull at the Museum Wiesbaden in Wiesbaden, Germany

The mantled guereza has a distinctive pelage, which is mostly black, with long white fringes of silky hair—known as a mantle or ornamentation—along the sides of its body and tail. The bands that make up the mantle start at the shoulders and extend along the back until they connect at the lower torso. The tail is long and ends in a white tuft which varies in how much it covers the tail. These features vary in color among subspecies, for example the tail of C. g. guereza is gray until the white tail tuft which covers half of its length, while the tail tuft of C. g. caudatus makes up 80% of the tail. The mantle color ranges from white to cream or yellow. Its face is framed by white hair and it has bushy cheek hairs. The thigh has a white stripe.

Infants are born with pink skin and white hair. The hair and skin darken as they age and by three to four months they attain adult coloration. Male usually gain their coloration before females. The male typically weighs 9.3 and 13.5 kilograms (21 and 30 lb) and the female weighs between 7.8 and 9.2 kilograms (17 and 20 lb). The head and body length averages 61.5 centimetres (24.2 in) for males and 57.6 centimetres (22.7 in) for females. Like most colobi, the mantled guereza has a small thumb that is vestigial. There is dentition sexual dimorphism among the subspecies. In some, the males have larger teeth than females, in others the reverse is true, and some have no significant difference.

== Distribution and habitat ==
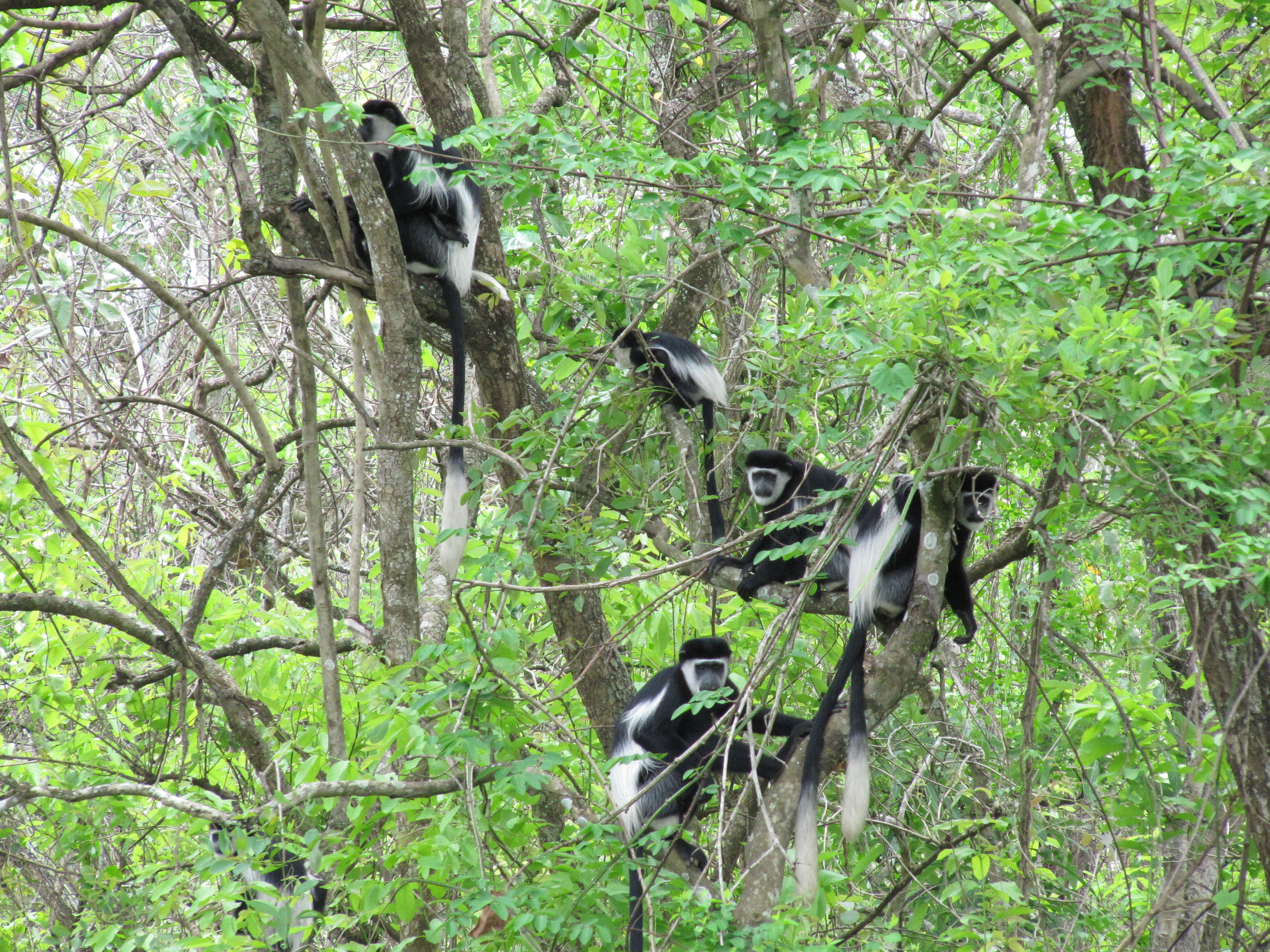
Mantled guerezas are arboreal and prefer secondary forests.

The mantled guereza is distributed throughout Equatorial Africa. It ranges from Nigeria and Cameroon in the west to Ethiopia, Kenya, Uganda, and northern Tanzania in the east. The mantled guereza lives in both deciduous and evergreen forests. It mainly inhabits forest and savannah woodlands and often extend into highland and montane forests. It can be found in other forest habitats, both primary and secondary, such as riparian (near fresh or brackish water), gallery, and upland forests. It is particularly common in forests close to rivers and lakes and at high elevations. It can be found in elevations as high as 3,300 metres (10,800 ft). This species prefers secondary forests and selects them over old-growth forests if given the choice. It is likely that the mantled guereza prefers these forests due to the increased number of food trees and the weaker chemical defenses of the species within. The mantled guereza is sometimes found in swamps as well as human-made habitats such as Eucalyptus plantations, which may be frequented when the monkey has nutritional deficiencies.

== Ecology ==
The mantled guereza is primarily arboreal, but does sometimes descend on the ground to forage and travel, perhaps more so than most other colobines. It is diurnal and rests for up to half the day. Foraging or travelling are the next most common activity. Sometime after dawn, mantled guereza groups leave their sleeping trees and will return to them at dusk. During the day, the mantled guereza has long rest periods in between periods of moving and feeding. Other activities, including grooming, greeting, playing and being vigilant, are performed to a lesser extent.

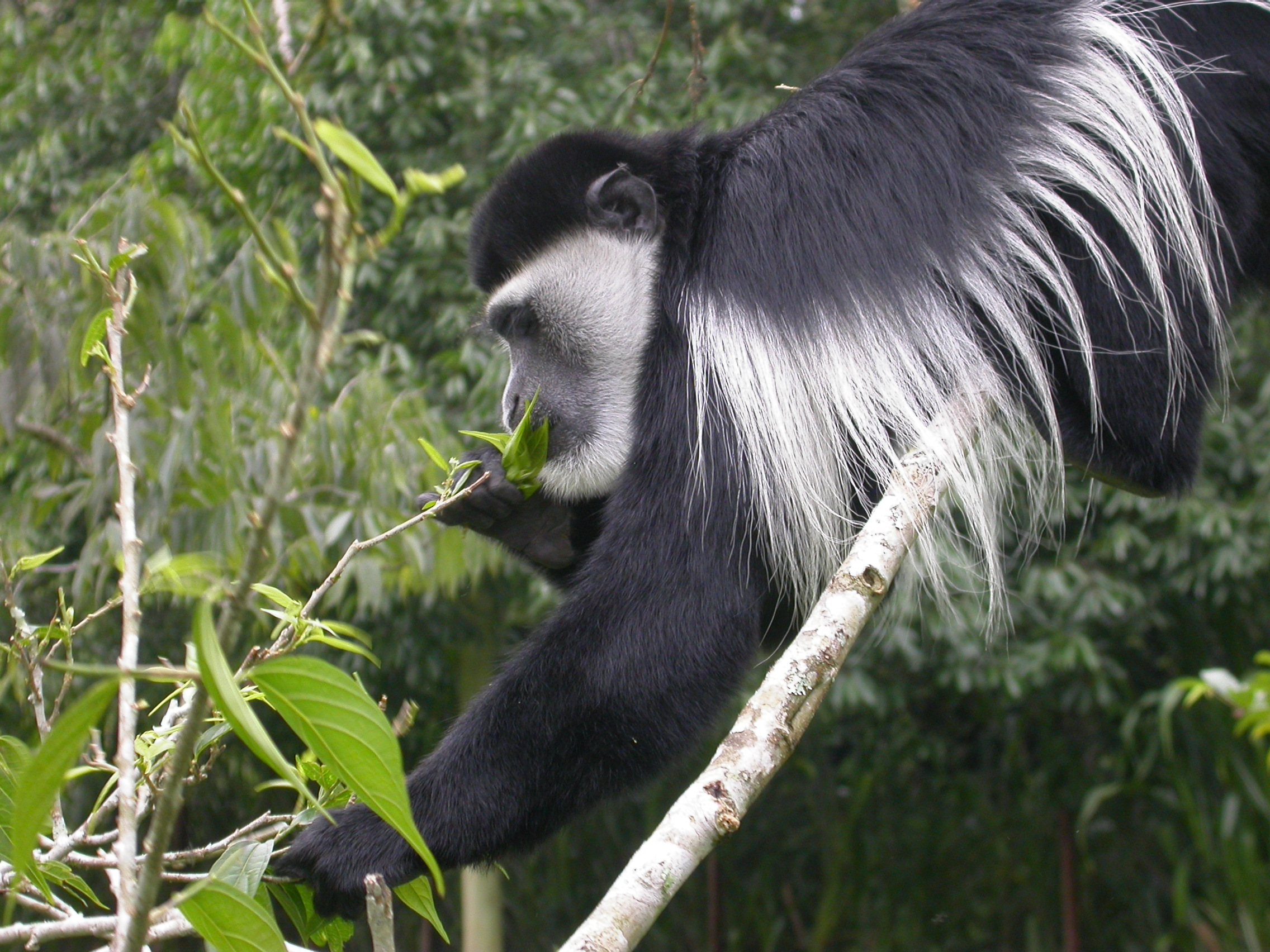
The diet of the mantled guereza is predominantly leaves, often of only a few tree species.

Despite its reputation as an exclusive leaf-eater, the mantled guereza is not an obligate folivore. While it mainly eats leaves and fruit, its diet is quite variable. It may eat bark, wood, seeds, flowers, petioles, lianas, aquatic-plants, arthropods, soil, and even concrete from buildings. The amount of each food item in its diet varies by area and time of year. Nutritional factors like protein, tannins, and sodium levels in leaves influence its food choices. It may even intermittently travel longer distances to access plants with higher levels of nutrition. Leaves usually make up over half of its diet, although fruits are occasionally eaten more depending on the season. When foraging for leaves, the mantled guereza prefers young ones over old. With fleshy fruits, the mantled guereza prefers to eat them unripe, which may serve to reduce competition with primates that eat ripe fruits. It consumes a number of plant species but only some make up most of its diet at a specific site.

Like all colobi, the mantled guereza is able to digest leaves and other plant fibers with a large, multi-chambered stomach that contains bacteria in certain areas. Like most colobines, it prefers foods with high fiber content that can be easily extracted with its specialized stomach. The mantled guereza is mostly preyed on by the crowned hawk-eagle, but it is also eaten by other birds of prey such as Verreaux's eagle. The common chimpanzee is known to hunt the guereza. The leopard is another possible predator.

== Behaviour ==
=== Social structure ===
The mantled guereza lives in stable social groups usually containing three to fifteen members. The groups usually contain one male, several females and juveniles. In some populations, groups containing several males are common. In multi-male groups, males tend to be aggressive with one another with one being dominant. Some males may be expelled from these groups. Multi-male groups may contain father-son pairs or unrelated males. Males that are not part of groups either live solitarily or with other outside males in bachelor groups. The females keep the groups cohesive and they are matrilineally related. They rarely disperse from their natal groups, except possibly when they break apart. Males on the other hand, usually leave when they become subadults or adults. They may start out being solitary and or in bachelor groups. They gain entry into a social group either by being on the periphery or displacing a group male.

Because of its low quality diet and the dispersed distribution of its food, the mantled guereza has a resident-egalitarian social structure. Female guerezas living in a group often have an egalitarian dominance style with no formalized rank relations. Relationships are relaxed and friendly with rare signals of dominance or subordinance. Physical aggression within the group is usually not harmful and rarely escalates into a conflict. Allogrooming is an important part of mantled guereza interactions and mostly occurs between females. The adult males rarely groom in the groups. While not strictly territorial, mantled guereza groups can be aggressive towards each other. In some populations, groups may defend core areas (which exist as a small part of the home range), resources, and mates. During intergroup encounters, males can engage in direct or indirect mate defense, like defending a female's resources. It is the males that participate in agonistic inter-group encounters but female may do so as well. Aggressive encounters between groups usually involve chases, displays and vocalizations rather than physical contact.

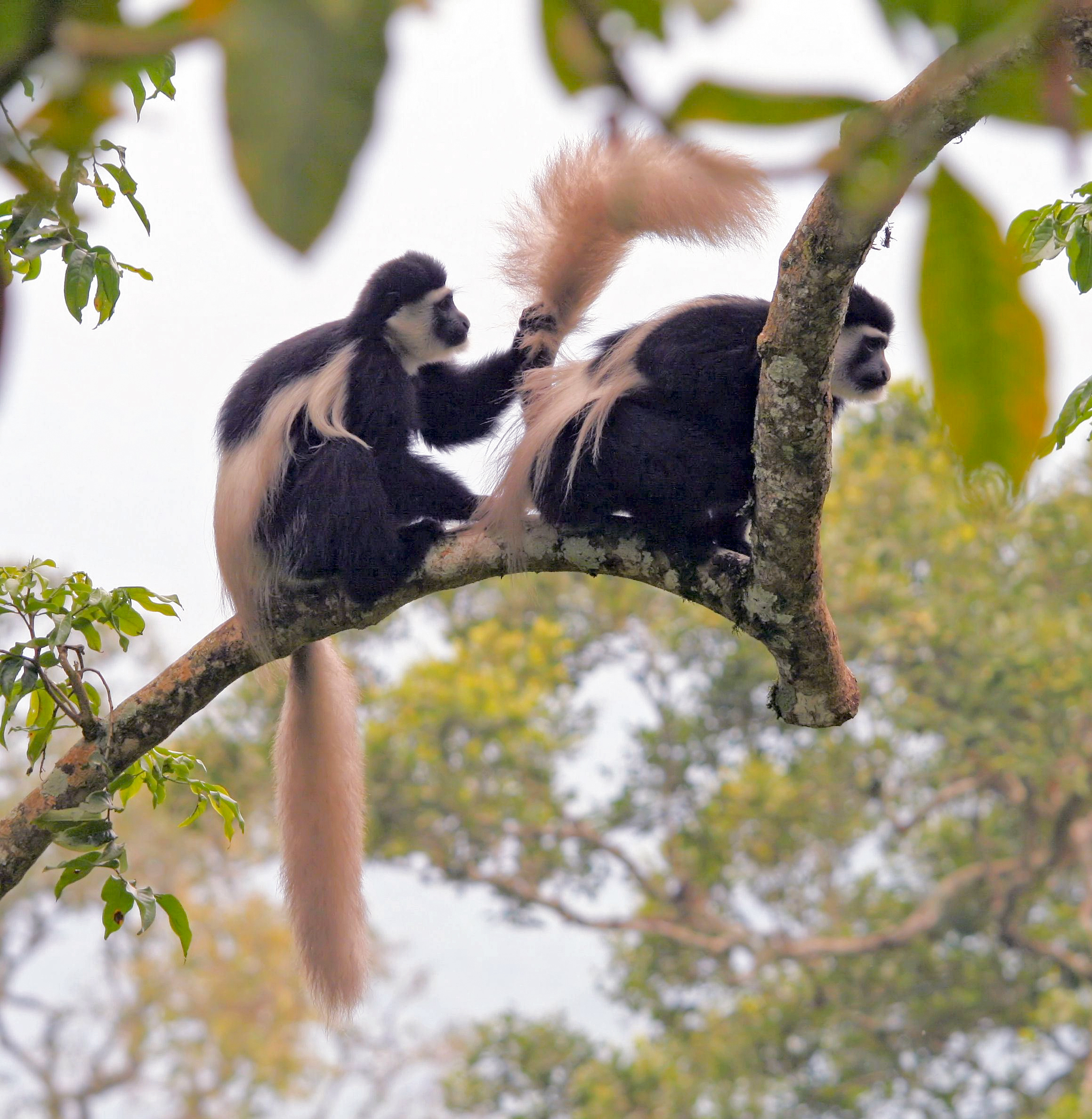
Social grooming mainly occurs between females.

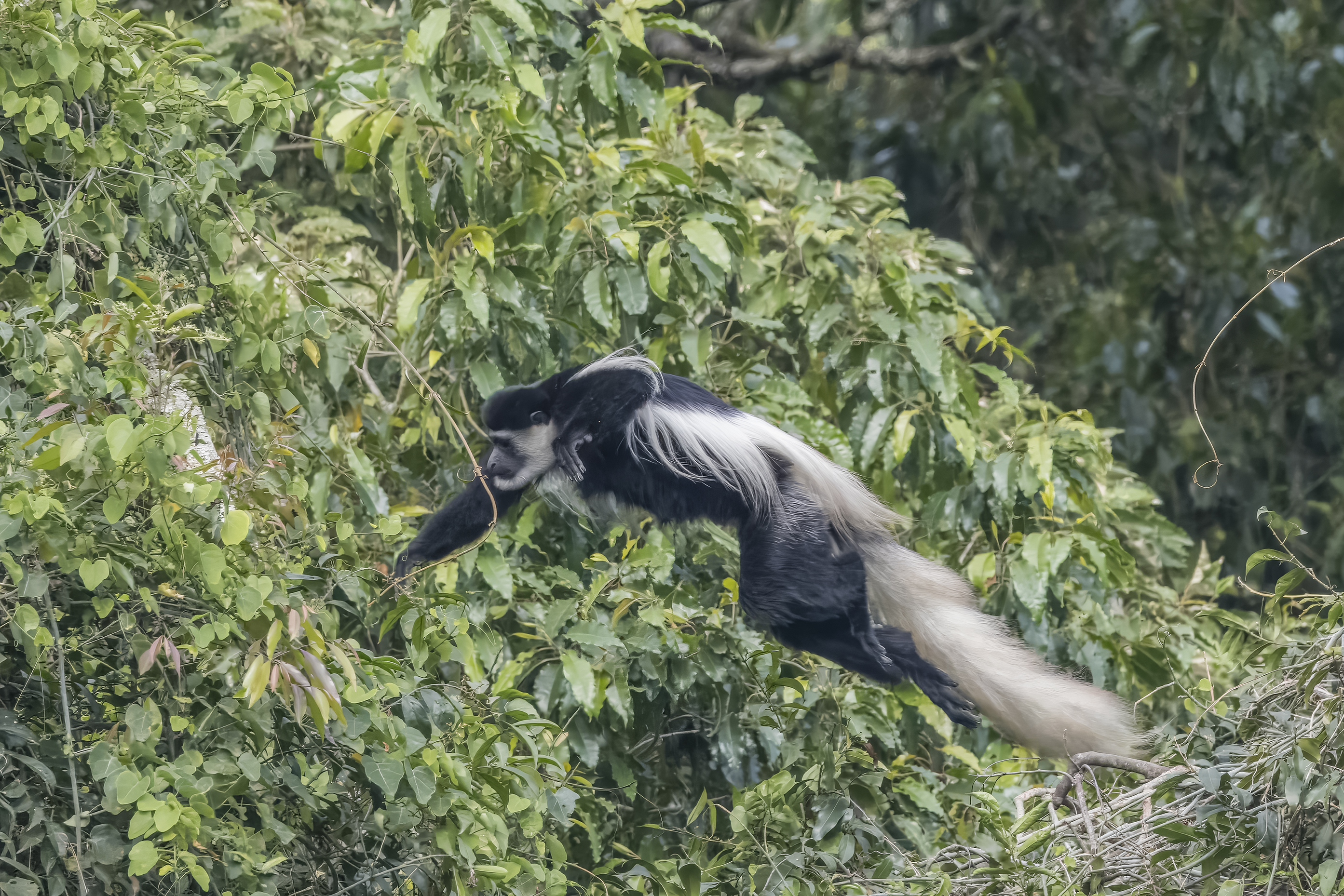
C. g. caudatus jumping between trees

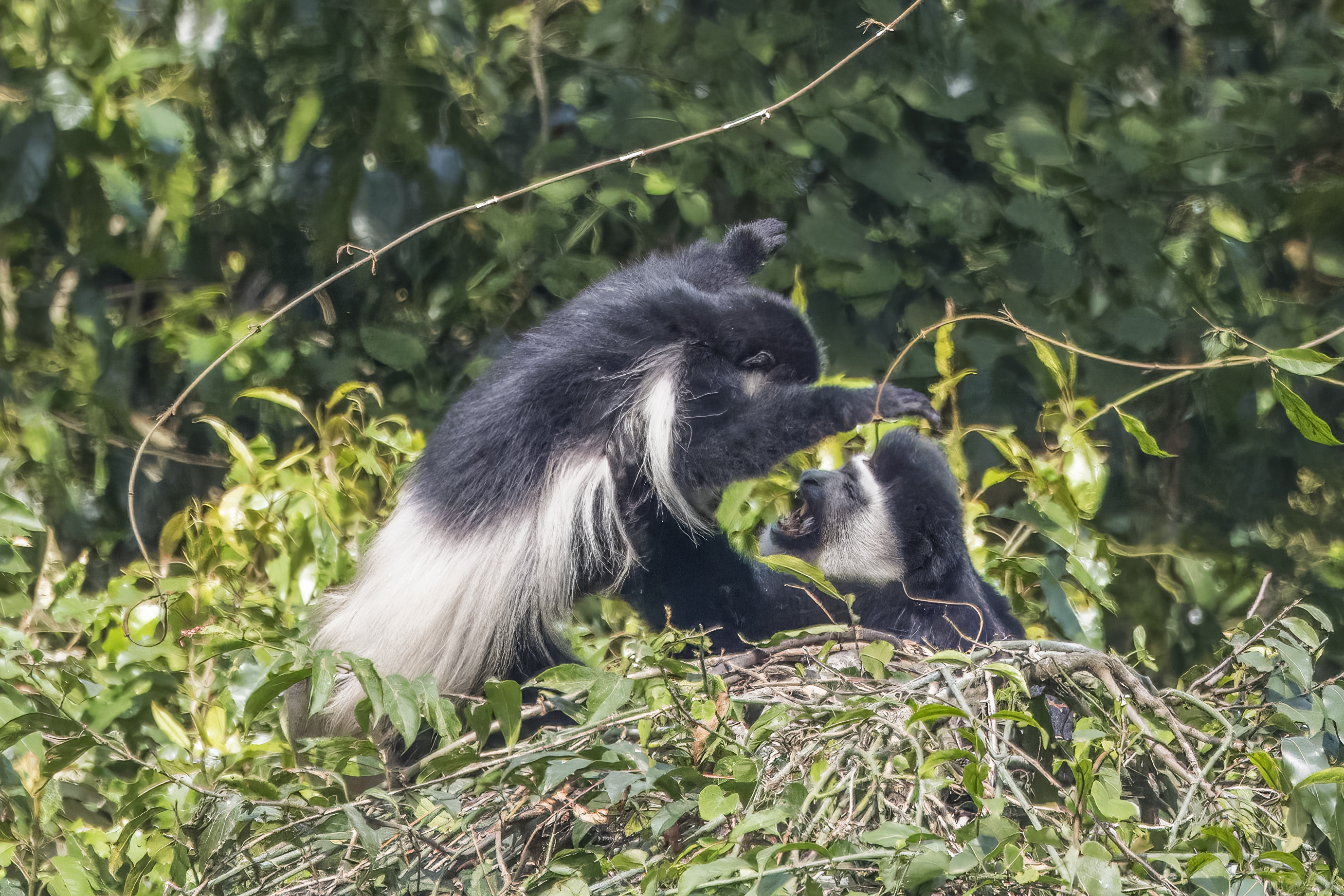
Juvenile C. g. caudatus play-fighting

=== Reproduction and parenting ===
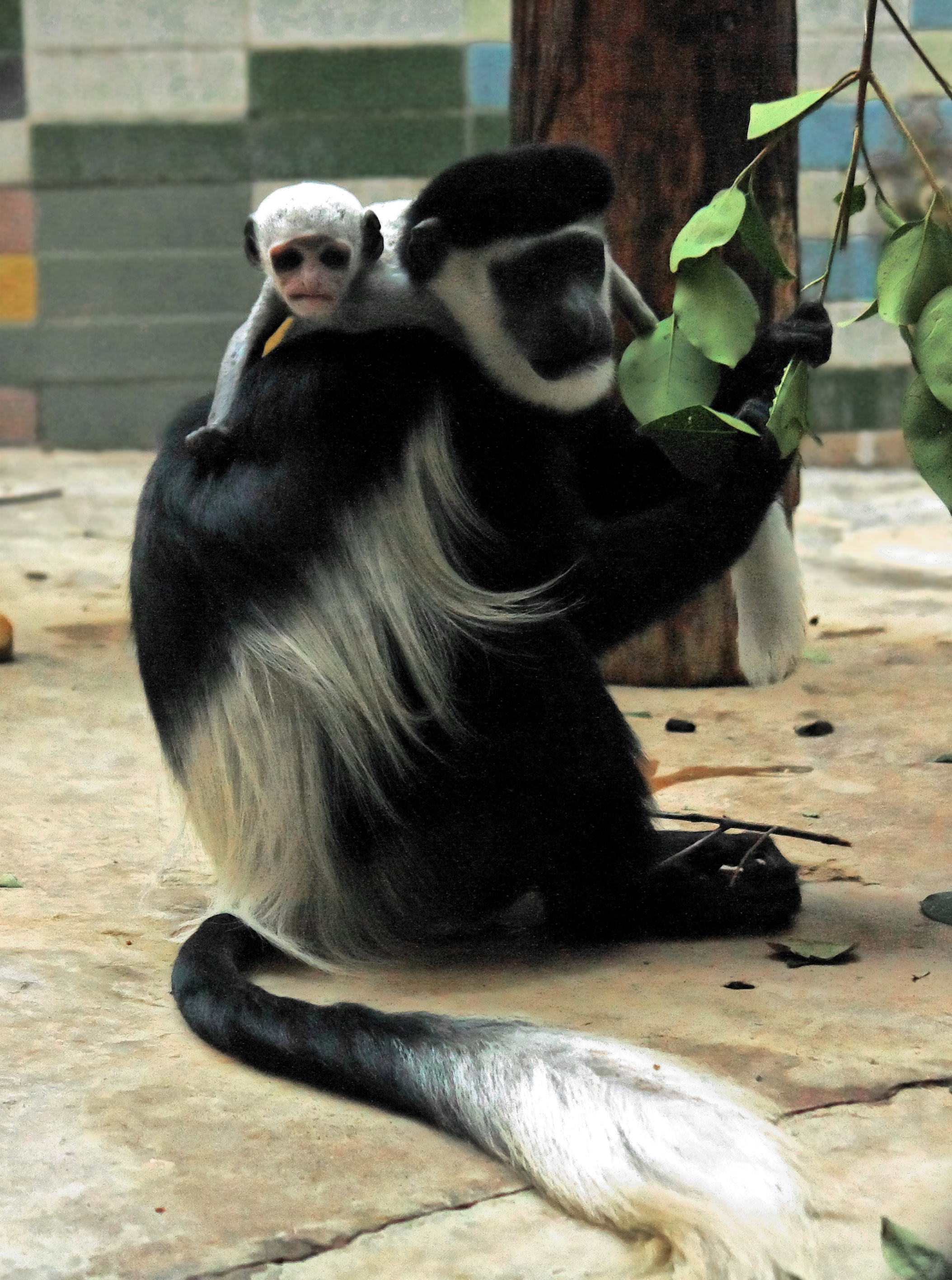
Infants are born with white fur and are always carried during the first months of their life.

The mantled guereza has a polygynous harem-based mating system. Mating solicitations are made by both males and females, half of the time for each. To solicit mating, the mantled guereza will walk near its potential partner and make low-intensity mouth clicks or tough-smacks. During copulation, the males hold on the female's ankles and body. Most matings take place between individuals of the same group but copulations outside of the group have been recorded. In multi-male groups, more than one male may mate with the females. The gestation period lasts 158 days with a 16–22 month interbirth interval. The newborn guereza relies on its mother for support and must cling to her. As they grow older, infants can move on their own but keep returning to their mothers. The infants take up most of the attention in the groups. The other females in a group may handle an infant although the latter are only comfortable with their mothers. The males normally do not pay much attention to infants until they are four to five weeks old. Infants can eat solid food at about eight to nine weeks and by fifty weeks they are fully weaned and no longer need to hold on to their mothers.

=== Communication ===
The most notable vocalization of the mantled guereza is the "roar", which is made mainly at night or dawn by males. The sound of a roar can be carried for up to a mile. It is normally the dominant male who roars when there are multiple males in the group. Roars are used for long-distance communication and can regulate inter-group spacing without direct, physical contact while foraging. When one male starts roaring, neighboring males will start to roar as well. Often, the mantled guereza will respond to calls regardless of "caller identity," focusing more on the collective vocal displays and not the familiarity of the caller. There is variation in the roars of males which could signal the status of their group and fighting ability. With a roar, a male can advertise his body size; both actual and exaggerated. Other vocalizations are made as well. Males may snort, possibly as an alarm call. "Purrs" are made before group movements. Females and infants may "caw" when under mild distress. When in more serious distress, like if an infant is in danger, females and sub-adults will squeak or scream. "Tongue-clicking" is made during mild aggression. In addition to vocalizations, the mantled guereza communicates with several different body postures and movements, displaying of fringe fur, facial expressions, and touches.

== Conservation status ==
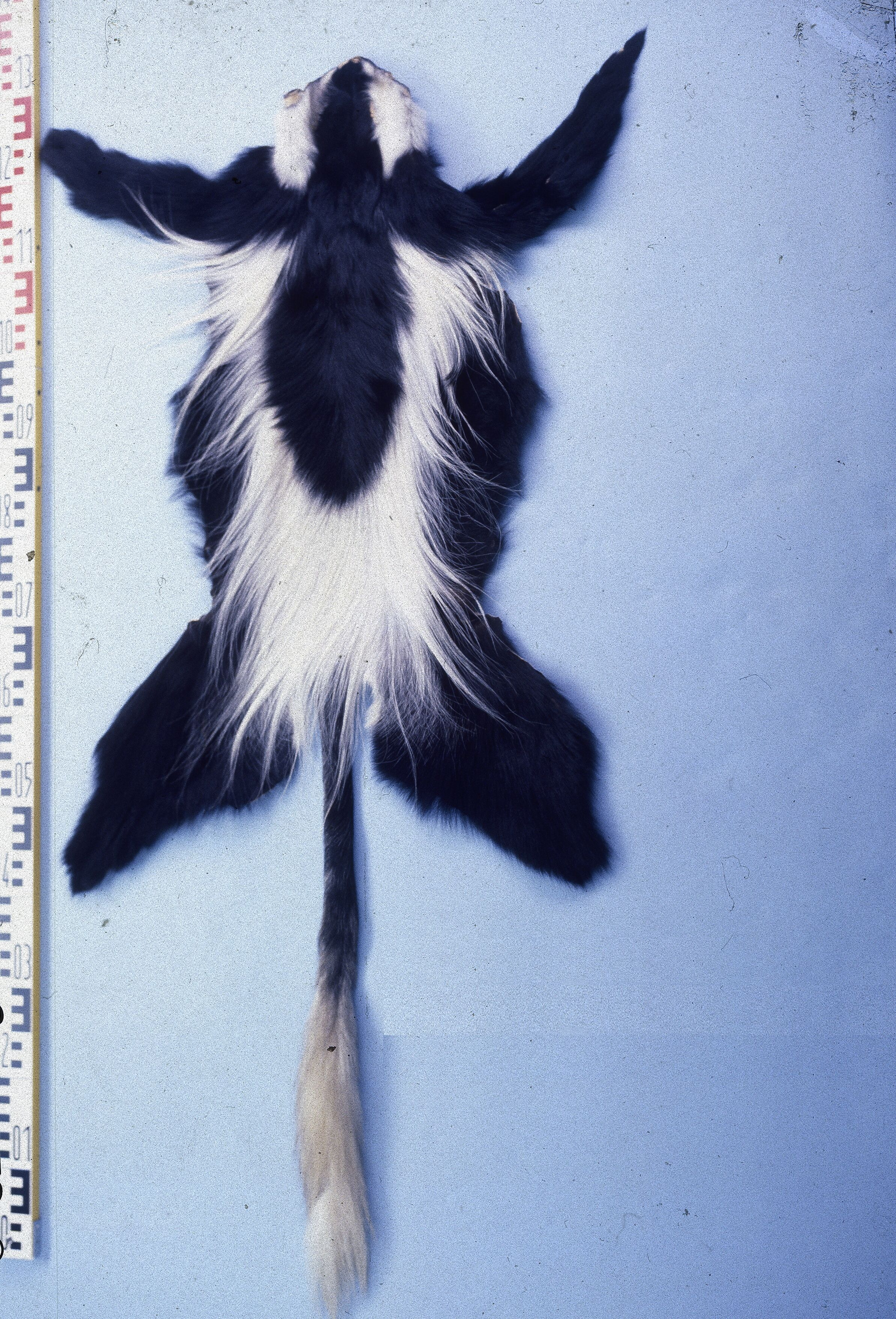
The mantled guereza is hunted for its skin and meat.

Because it can live in both dry and gallery forests and move on the ground, the mantled guereza is less threatened than many other colobine species. The IUCN lists it as Least Concern because "although locally threatened in parts of its range, this widespread species is not thought to be declining fast enough to place it in a higher category of threat." However, some of the subspecies are classified under different categories. The Mt Uaraguess guereza, C. g. percivali, is listed as Endangered due to its small range and its risk from hunting, while the Dodinga Hills guereza, C. g. dodingae, the Djaffa Mountains guereza, C. g. gallarum, and the Mau Forest guereza, C. g. matschiei are all listed as Data Deficient.

The Dodinga Hills guereza has not been recorded since the 1960s. Unlike most other primate species, the mantled guereza can survive habitat degradation and can even thrive in degraded forests. Sometimes, logging may increase the number of preferred food trees for the mantled guereza and it is more abundant in logged areas than unlogged ones. However, complete forest clearance causes dramatic declines in numbers. In Uganda complete forest clearings caused a decline of 50% over eight years. The mantled guereza is also threatened by hunting for meat and its skin. Mantled guereza meat sells as bushmeat for US$4–9. The skins have been sold for fashion or in the tourist trade.

== Cited sources ==
- Davies, A. G.; Oates, J. F., eds. (1994). Colobine Monkeys: Their Ecology, Behaviour and Evolution. Cambridge, UK: Cambridge University Press. ISBN 978-0-521-33153-1.
  - Oates, J. F.; Davies, A. G.; Delson, E. (1994). The diversity of living colobines. pp. 45–73.
  - Oates (1994a). The natural history of African colobines. pp. 75–128.
  - Oates, J. F. (1994b). Conclusions: the past, present and future of the colobines. pp. 347–358.
