= Colobus flandrini =

Colobus flandrini Temporal range: Late Miocene

Scientific classification
- Domain: Eukaryota
- Kingdom: Animalia
- Phylum: Chordata
- Class: Mammalia
- Order: Primates
- Suborder: Haplorhini
- Infraorder: Simiiformes
- Family: Cercopithecidae
- Genus: Colobus
- Species: †C. flandrini

Binomial name
- †Colobus flandrini Delson, 1973

Synonyms
- Macaca flandrini

Extinct species of monkey

Colobus flandrini is an extinct species of colobus monkey that lived in Africa (Algeria) during the Miocene around 10 million years ago.

It is the oldest known colobus monkey and is one of only two extinct species of true colobus monkey described so far, the other species being Colobus freedmani. C. flandrini was larger than its living relatives, estimated at 21 kg (46 lb) in weight.

Fossils of C. flandrini were originally assigned to Macaca by Arambourg before being assigned their current placement by Delson (1973).
