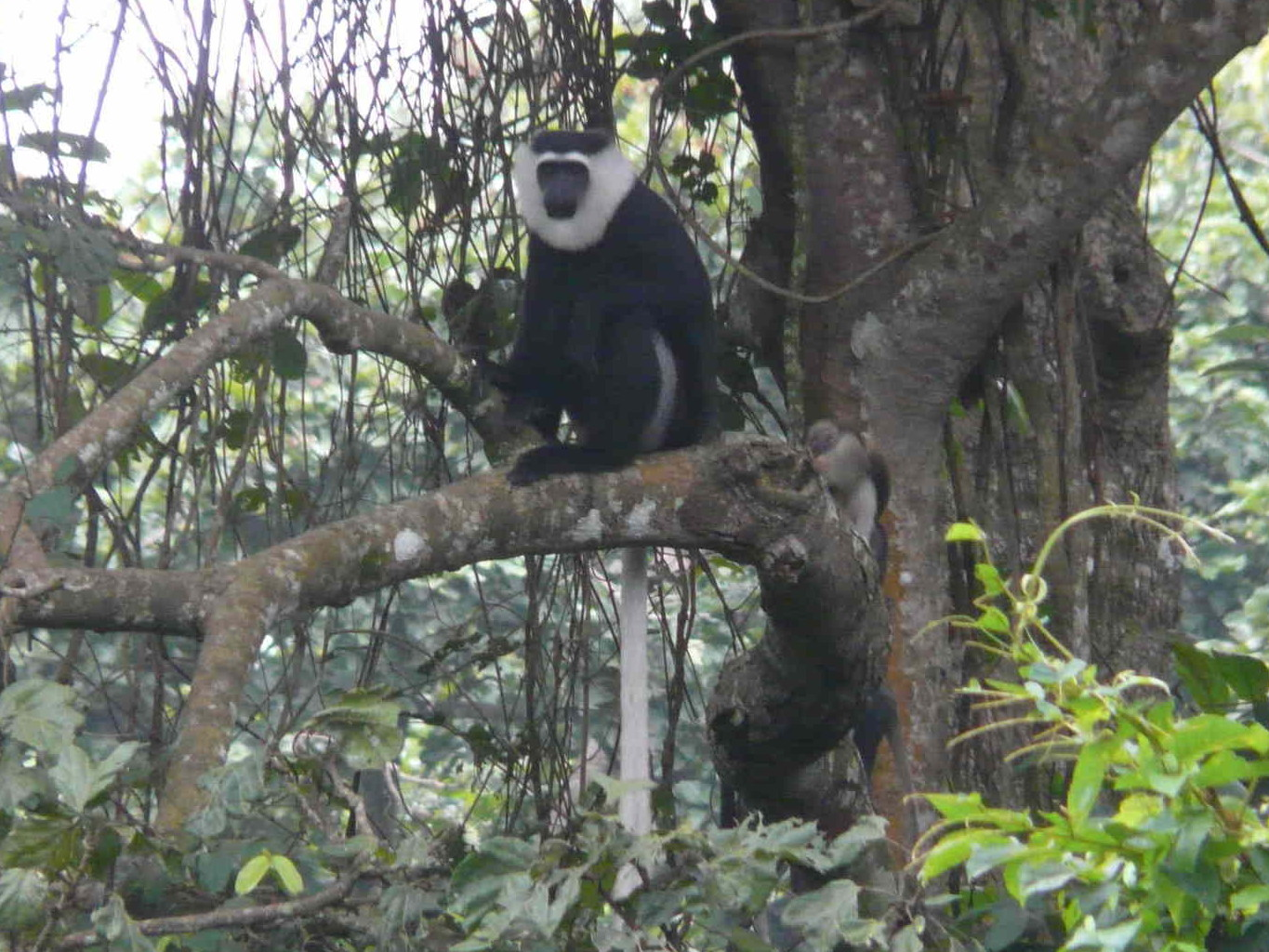

Conservation status
- Critically Endangered (IUCN 3.1)

Scientific classification
- Kingdom: Animalia
- Phylum: Chordata
- Class: Mammalia
- Order: Primates
- Family: Cercopithecidae
- Genus: Colobus
- Species: C. vellerosus

Binomial name
- Colobus vellerosus (I. Geoffroy, 1830)
- Geographic range

= Ursine colobus =

Species of Old World monkey

The ursine colobus (Colobus vellerosus), also known as the white-thighed colobus, Geoffroy's black-and-white colobus, or the white-thighed black-and-white colobus, is a West African species of primate in the family Cercopithecidae.

== Description ==
The ursine colobus is quite distinctive, with predominantly black fur and lacking a white mantle. They have a black and naked face which is surrounded by a thick white halo of fur. The ursine colobus is further characterized by white patches on the thighs which vary in width and length. Like other species of colobus, the babies are born with an all white fur coat, which starts to turn black at around three months of age. In contrast to other species of colobus, they have slender bodies and ischial callosities, a hard thickened area of skin on the buttocks that allows comfortable sitting on branches. It has an all white tail which is longer than the body. They weigh between 9.9 to 10.3 kg (22 to 23 lb) for males and 8.3 to 8.7 kg (18 to 19 lb) in females with a body length of is 61 to 66 cm (24 to 26 in) in males and 61 to 64 cm (24 to 25 in) in females.

== Biology ==
Ursine colobus are diurnal and highly arboreal, coming down from trees only occasionally when feeding. Their social behavior is like that of many polygynous monkeys, with each group consisting of related females their juvenile offspring and a territorial male. The males are highly territorial and disperse upon reaching sexual maturity.

Ursine colobus use a roaring call to advertise territory and location, this roar is a low "rur, rur, rur" noise. They also have alarm calls that alert group members when predators have been seen which are a "snorting" sound, made by all members of the group except infants.

Ursine colobus are mainly vegetarian and have a diet which is made up of new leaves and seeds, with the occasional addition of fruits, insects, and termite clay.

== Habitat ==
Ursine colobuses are found in lowland rainforest and in gallery forests which extend northwards into the Guinea Forest Savannah Zone. In Bénin, these monkeys were observed in several habitats, including swamp forests, semi-deciduous forests and gallery forests.

== Distribution ==
It is found in Benin, Ivory Coast, Ghana, Nigeria, and Togo, as well as very southernmost Burkina Faso. Its natural habitat is subtropical or tropical moist lowland forests. It is threatened by habitat loss.

== Conservation ==
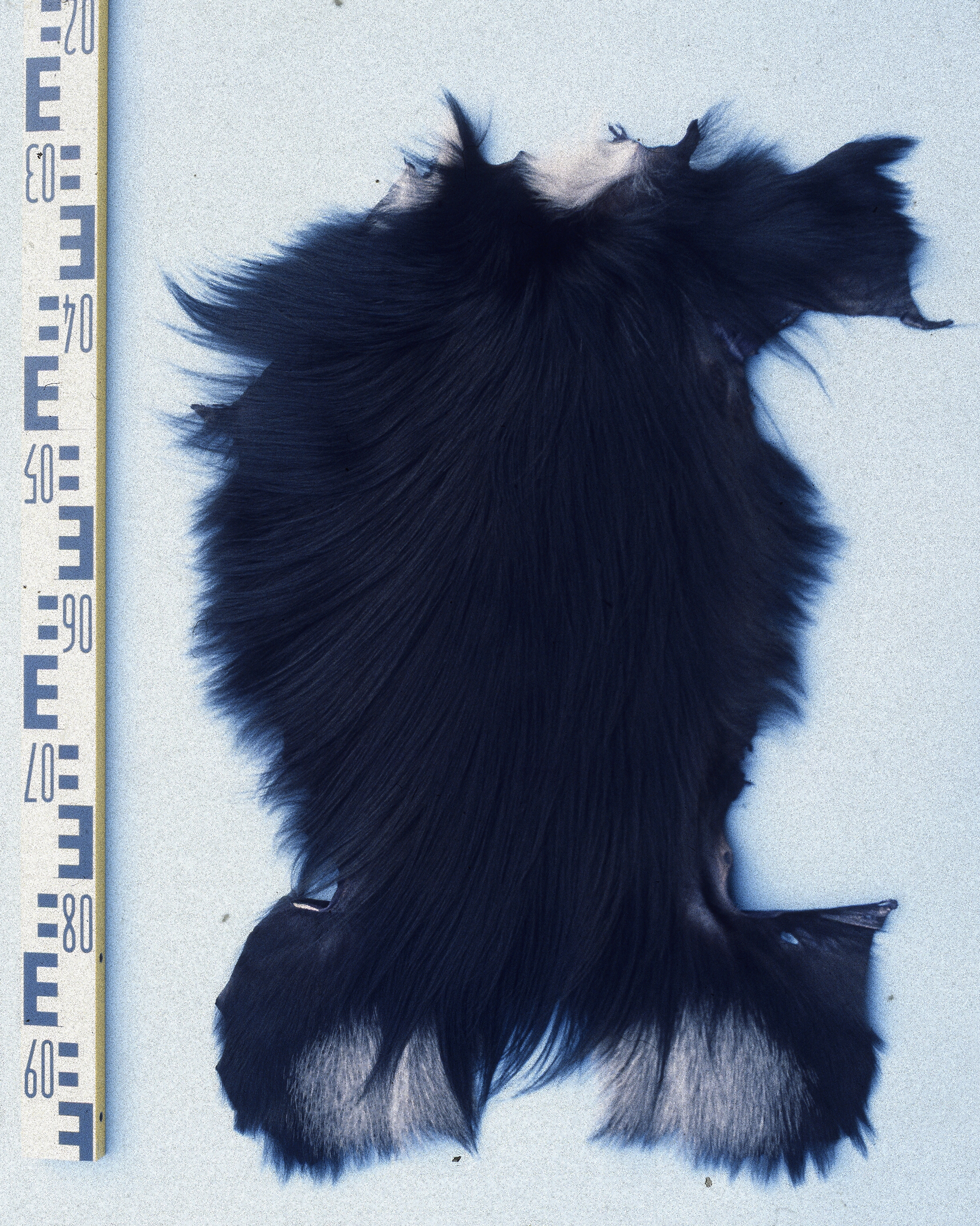
The ursine colobus is hunted for its skin and meat.

The ursine colobus is threatened by both hunting and deforestation. Its range falls within a region which includes a dense and rapidly growing human population, where forest destruction has been extensive, and there is uncontrolled hunting of wildlife in many places. However, in some parts of their range these monkeys are held to be sacred. It is listed as Class A under the African Convention, and under Appendix II of CITES. They are known to live within a number of protected areas including Comoe National Park, Fazao-Malfakassa National Park and Mole, Bui and Digya National Parks (Ghana).

== Nomenclature ==
The ursine colobus was formerly thought to be a subspecies of Colobus polykomos with which it interbred; however, it has since been recognized as a separate species.
