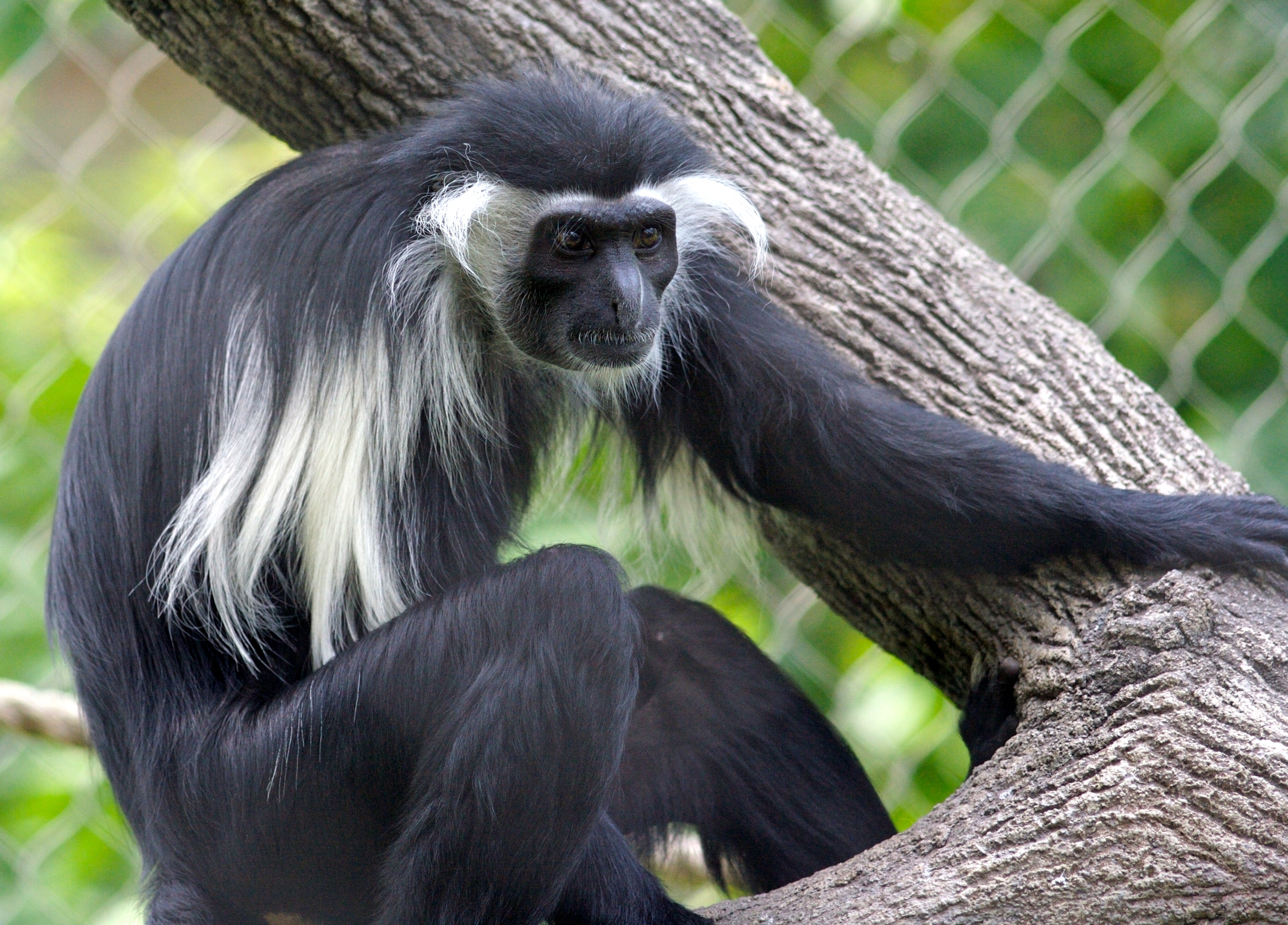
- Ruwenzori colobus (Colobus angolensis ruwenzorii)

Conservation status
- Vulnerable (IUCN 3.1)

Scientific classification
- Kingdom: Animalia
- Phylum: Chordata
- Class: Mammalia
- Infraclass: Placentalia
- Order: Primates
- Family: Cercopithecidae
- Genus: Colobus
- Species: C. angolensis

Binomial name
- Colobus angolensis P. Sclater, 1860

Subspecies
- See text
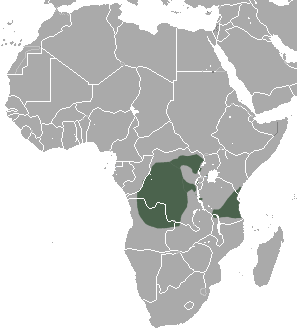
- Angola colobus range

= Angola colobus =

Species of Old World monkey

The Angola colobus (Colobus angolensis), Angolan black-and-white colobus, or Angolan colobus is a primate species of Old World monkey belonging to the genus Colobus.

== Taxonomy ==
The Angola colobus has six to eight recognized subspecies:

Common name	Scientific name	location	IUCN status	
Sclater's Angola colobus	C. a. angolensis	Angola, DR Congo, Zambia	VU	
Powell-Cotton's Angola colobus	C. a. cottoni	DR Congo	VU	
Ruwenzori colobus	C. a. ruwenzorii (Thomas)	a number of isolated populations in DR Congo, Burundi, Rwanda, Tanzania, Uganda	DD	
Cordier's Angola colobus	C. a. cordieri	DR Congo	VU	
Prigogine's Angola colobus	C. a. prigoginei	Mt. Kabobo	EN	alternatively a synonym of C. a. cordieri
Peters Angola colobus or Tanzanian black-and-white colobus	C. a. palliatus	Tanzania and southeast Kenya	VU	
Mahale Mountains Angolan colobus	C. a. mahale	Mahale Mountains, Tanzania	CR	
Sharpe's Angola colobus	C. a. sharpei	Tanzania, Malawi	VU	alternatively a synonym of C. a. palliatus

== Physical characteristics ==
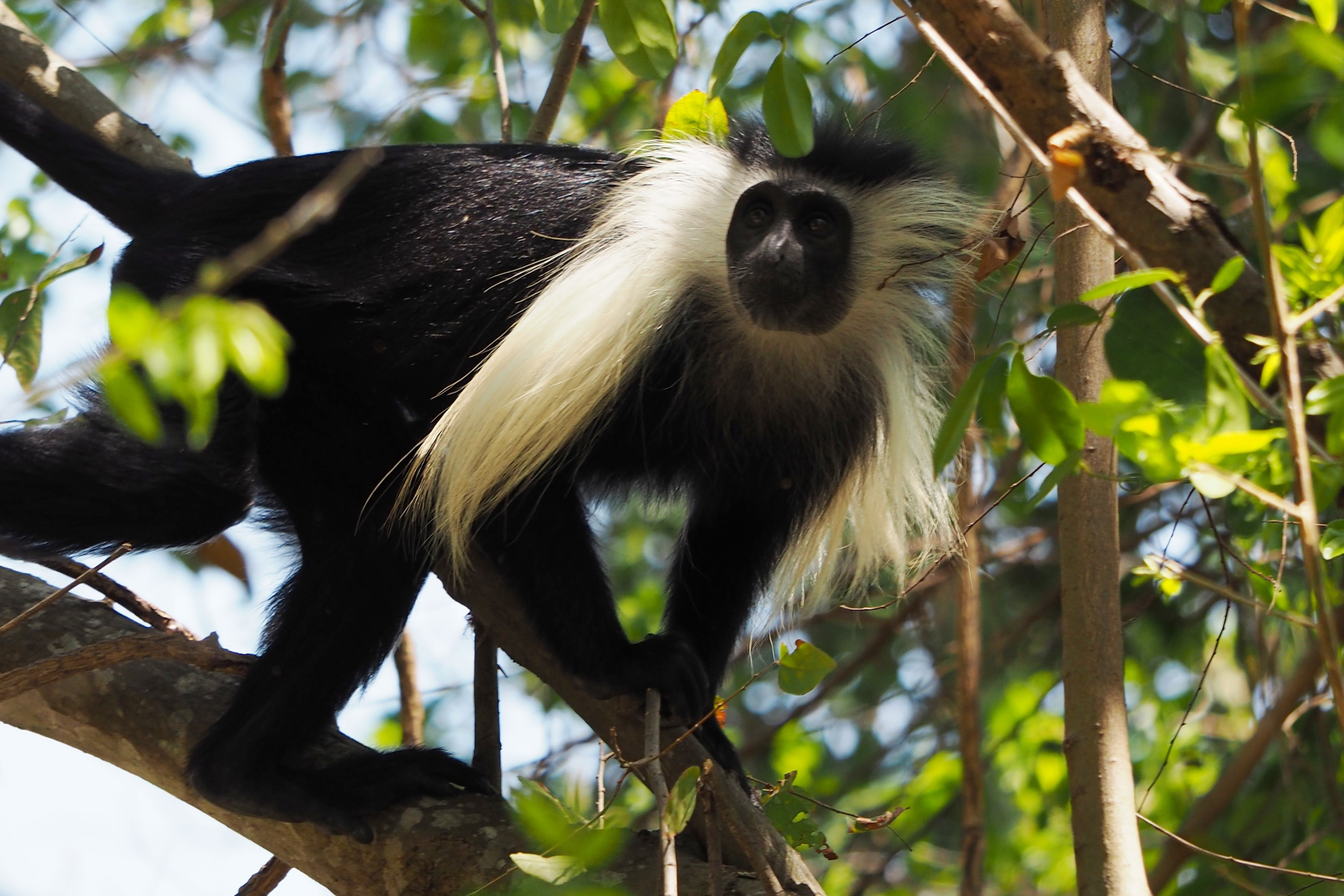
Tanzanian black-and-white colobus (Colobus angolensis subsp. palliatus) in Selous Game Reserve, Tanzania

Like all black-and-white colobi, the Angola colobus has black fur and a black face, surrounded by long, white locks of hair. It also has a mantle of white hair on the shoulders. The long, thin tail can be either black or white, but the tip is always white. There is a significant regional variation in the total amount of white on the body and the length of the fur. Animals that live in the mountains have longer, thicker fur than animals from the lowlands to protect them against the cold.

The Angola colobus has a head-body length of 50 to 70 cm (20 to 28 in), with the males usually being larger than females. The tail is about 75 cm (30 in) long, and the body weight varies between 9 and 20 kg (20 and 44 lb).

== Distribution and habitat ==
The Angola colobus occurs in dense rainforests, both in the lowlands and coastal mountains. It lives in most of the Congo Basin, to the south and northeast of the Congo River, as far as Ruwenzori, Burundi and southwestern Uganda. The species can also be found in East Africa, especially in the interior and coastal forests of Kenya and Tanzania and in isolated mountain areas. Although the species is named after Angola, it is quite rare in that country. Of all Colobus species, the Angola colobus occurs in the southernmost latitudes. The geographical range lies south of that of the mantled guereza. It is found up to 2,415 m (7,923 ft) above sea level in Kenya.

== Ecology and behaviour ==
All Colobus species are very sociable and live in groups of up to several hundred animals, although most groups are much smaller. Their diet consists of mostly leaves, but also lesser amounts of fruit and seeds.
