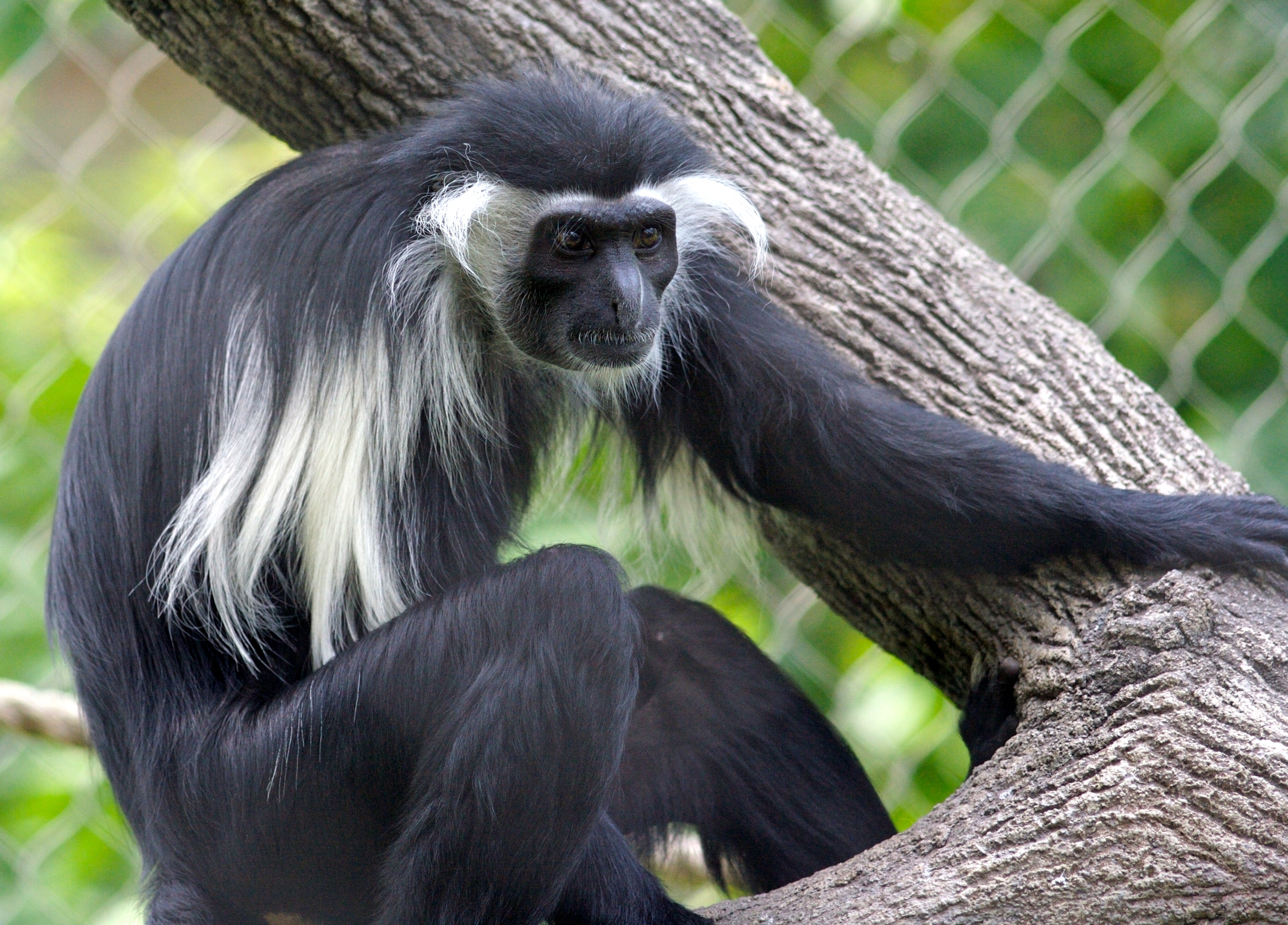

Scientific classification
- Kingdom: Animalia
- Phylum: Chordata
- Class: Mammalia
- Order: Primates
- Family: Cercopithecidae
- Genus: Colobus
- Species: C. angolensis
- Subspecies: C. a. ruwenzorii

Trinomial name
- Colobus angolensis ruwenzorii Thomas, 1901

= Ruwenzori colobus =

Ruwenzori black-and-white colobus

Subspecies of monkey

The Ruwenzori colobus (Colobus angolensis ruwenzorii), also known as Ruwenzori black-and-white colobus, is a subspecies of the Angola colobus. This primate is distributed from the Afromontane forests of the Ruwenzori Mountains across the mountains in Burundi and Rwanda to the northern shore of Lake Tanganyika.

== Taxonomy ==
In 1901, Oldfield Thomas described two skins of Ruwenzori colobus zoological specimens that were collected at the northwestern slopes of the Ruwenzori Mountains in Bwamba Country of western Uganda. Thomas considered it a species using the scientific name Colobus ruwenzorii.

== Characteristics ==
The Ruwenzori colobus is black with hair on the shoulders between 23 and 33 cm (9.1 and 13.0 in) long. Its tail is also black and greyish-white at the end. It has white bushy tufts on the cheeks. The white hair on the forehead forms a crest.

== Distribution and habitat ==
The Ruwenzori colobus occurs at Lake Nabugabo and Rwenzori Mountains National Park in Uganda. Troops of 300 to 400 individuals inhabit Rwanda's Nyungwe National Park.

Some authors reports indicate that it perhaps also occurs in some Tanzanian regions.

== Ecology and behaviour ==
The Ruwenzori colobus is a highly arboreal and acrobatic leaf-eater. Its diet consists of about two thirds of leaves and one third of fruit and seeds.

Although all Colobus species are very sociable, they usually move on the troops of several hundred animals.
