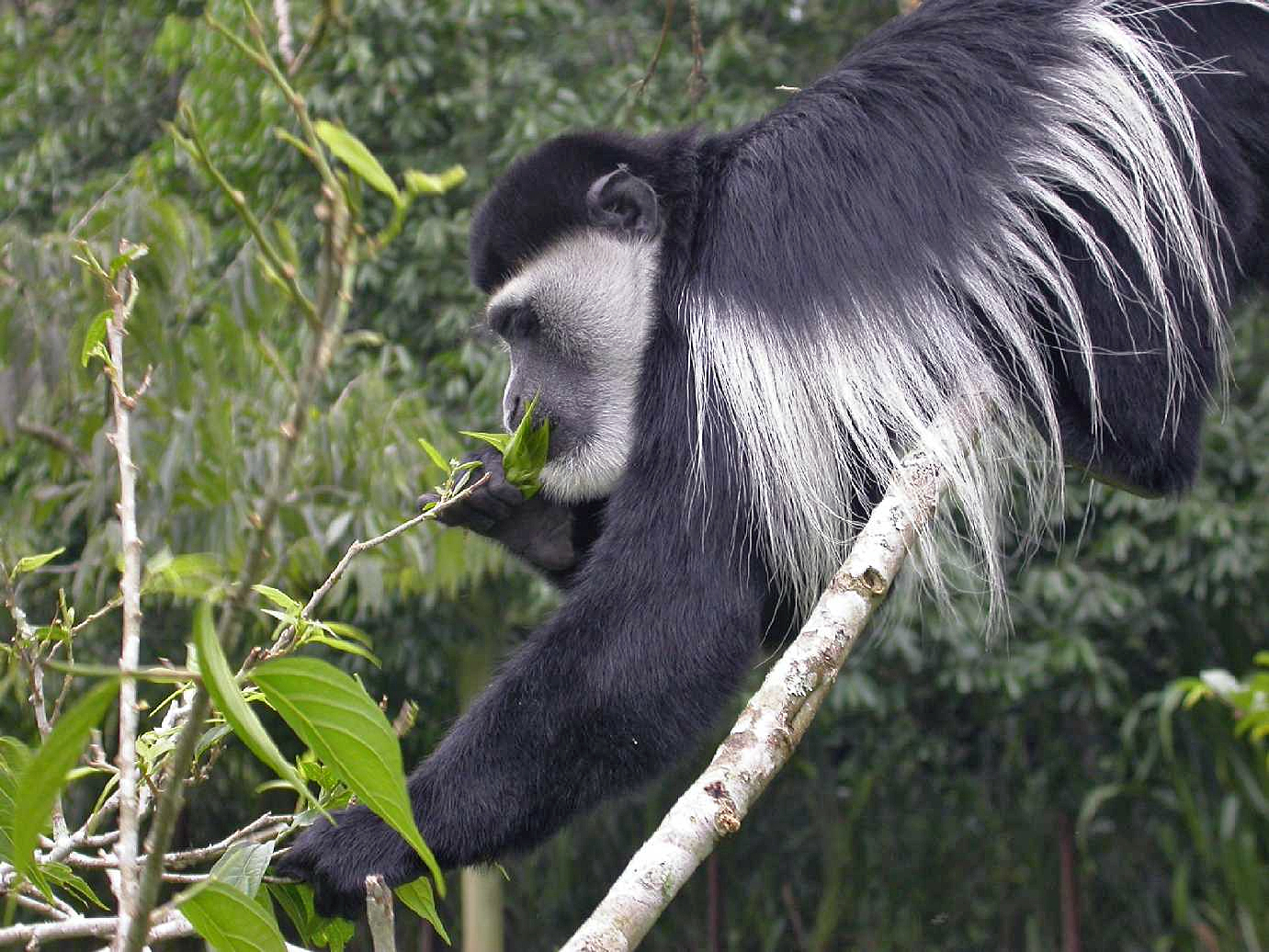
- Mantled guereza (Colobus guereza)

Scientific classification
- Kingdom: Animalia
- Phylum: Chordata
- Class: Mammalia
- Order: Primates
- Family: Cercopithecidae
- Subfamily: Colobinae
- Tribe: Colobini
- Genus: Colobus; Illiger, 1811

Type species
- Simia polycomos Schreber, 1800 (= Cebus polykomos Zimmermann, 1780)

Species
- See text

= Colobus =

Black-and-white colobus

Genus of Old World monkeys

The genus Colobus comprises the black-and-white colobus monkeys. It is a genus of Old World monkey native to Africa. The genus is closely related to the red colobus monkeys of genus Piliocolobus. There are six species assigned to this genus, and at least eight subspecies. They are generally found in high-density forests where they forage on leaves, flowers and fruit. Social groups of colobus are diverse, varying from group to group. Resident-egalitarian and allomothering relationships have been observed among the female population. Complex behaviours have also been observed in this species, including greeting rituals and varying group sleeping patterns. Colobi play a significant role in seed dispersal.

== Etymology ==
The word "colobus" comes from the Ancient Greek κολοβός (kolobós), meaning "docked, maimed" and refers to their stump-like thumb.

== Taxonomy ==
Genus Colobus – Illiger, 1811 – five species
Common name	Scientific name and subspecies	Range	Size and ecology	IUCN status and estimated population
Angola colobus	C. angolensis P. L. Sclater, 1860 Six subspecies: C. a. angolensis (Sclater's Angola colobus); C. a. cordieri (Cordier's Angola colobus); C. a. cottoni (Powell-Cotton's Angola colobus); C. a. palliatus (Tanzanian black-and-white colobus); C. a. prigoginei (Prigogine's Angola colobus); C. a. ruwenzorii (Ruwenzori colobus); C. a. sharpei (Sharpe's Angola Colobus)	Central Africa	Size: 49–68 cm (19–27 in) long, plus 70–83 cm (28–33 in) tail Habitat: Forest Diet: Leaves, as well as stems, bark, flowers, buds, shoots, fruits, and insects	VU Unknown
Black colobus	C. satanas Waterhouse, 1838 Two subspecies: C. s. anthracinus (Gabon black colobus); C. s. satanas (Bioko black colobus)	Western Africa	Size: 50–70 cm (20–28 in) long, plus 62–88 cm (24–35 in) tail Habitat: Forest Diet: Nuts and seeds, as well as unripe fruit and leaves	VU Unknown
King colobus	C. polykomos (Zimmermann, 1780)	Western Africa	Size: 45–72 cm (18–28 in) long, plus 52–100 cm (20–39 in) tail Habitat: Forest and savanna Diet: Leaves, as well as fruit and flowers	EN Unknown
Mantled guereza	C. guereza Rüppell, 1835 Seven subspecies: C. g. caudatus (Kilimanjaro guereza); C. g. dodingae (Dodinga Hills guereza); C. g. guereza (Omo River guereza); C. g. kikuyuensis (Eastern black-and-white colobus); C. g. matschiei (Mau Forest guereza); C. g. occidentalis (Western guereza); C. g. percivali (Mt Uaraguess guereza)	Central Africa	Size: 45–72 cm (18–28 in) long, plus 52–100 cm (20–39 in) tail Habitat: Forest Diet: Leaves, as well as fruit, buds, and blossoms	LC Unknown
Ursine colobus	C. vellerosus (I. Geoffroy, 1830)	Western Africa	Size: 60–67 cm (24–26 in) long, plus 73–93 cm (29–37 in) tail Habitat: Forest Diet: Leaves and seeds, as well as fruit, insects, and clay	CR 975
Likweli	C. congoensis Hart, Amboko, Arenson, Horton, Coates, Kapale, Koko, Hart, Gilbert, Sargis & Detwiler, 2026	Democratic Republic of Congo	Size: Habitat: Diet:	

Fossil species

- †Colobus flandrini
- †Colobus freedmani

== Behaviour and ecology ==
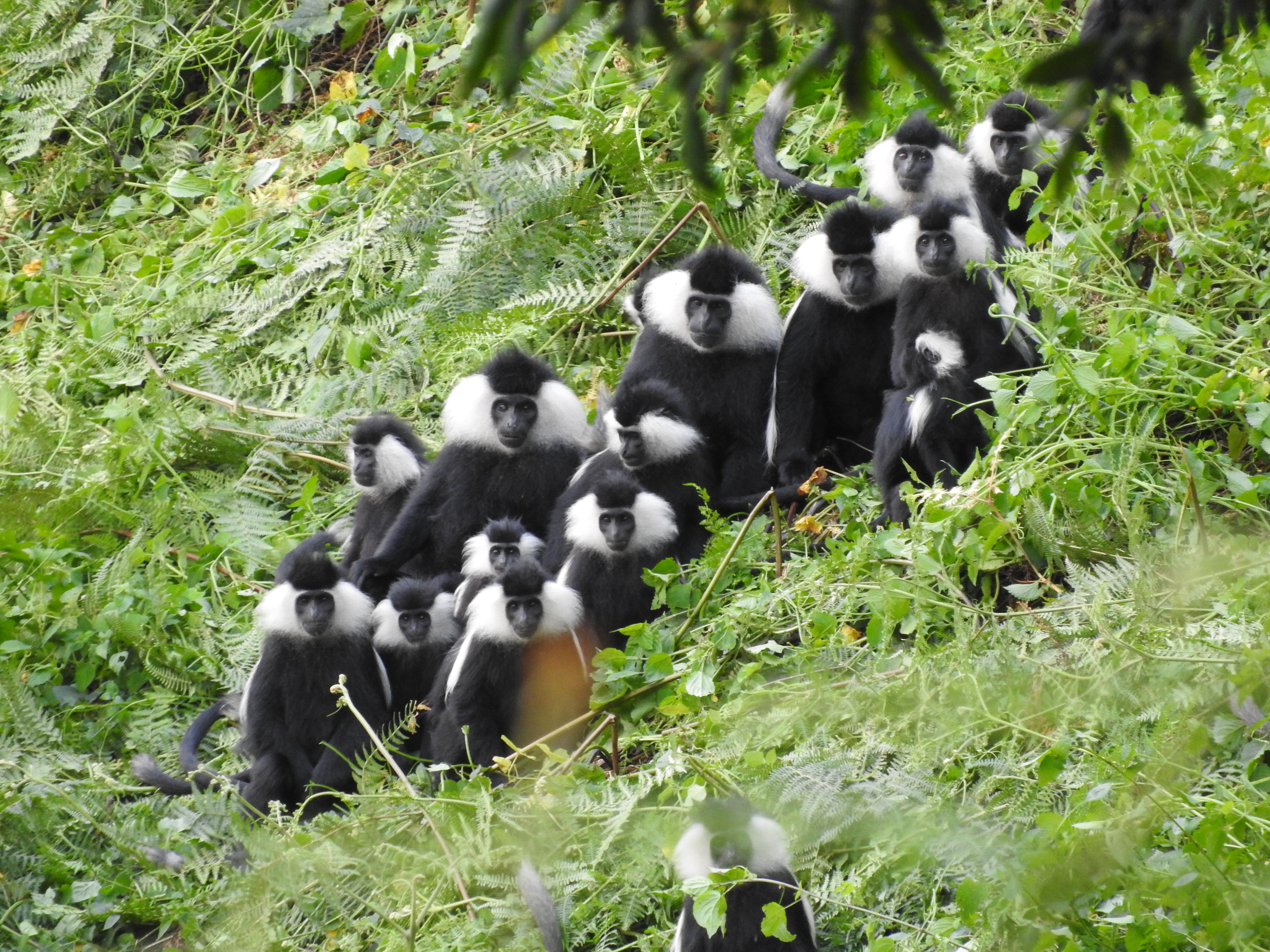
A multi-male unit of Angolan colobus in a multilevel society

Colobus habitats include primary and secondary forests, riverine forests, and wooded grasslands; they are found more in higher-density logged forests than in other primary forests. Their ruminant-like digestive systems have enabled them to occupy niches that are inaccessible to other primates: they are herbivorous, eating leaves, fruit, flowers, lichen, herbaceous vegetation and bark. Colobus species are important for seed dispersal through their sloppy eating habits, as well as through their digestive systems.

Leaf toughness influences colobus foraging efficiency. Tougher leaves correlate negatively with ingestion rate (g/min) as they are costly in terms of mastication, but positively with investment (chews/g). Individuals spend approximately 150 minutes actively feeding each day. In a montane habitat colobus are known to utilise lichen as a fallback food during periods of low food availability.

=== Social patterns and morphology ===
Colobus species live in territorial groups that vary in both size (3–15 individuals) and structure. It was originally believed that the structure of these groups consisted of one male and about 8 female members. However, more recent observations have shown variation in structure and the number of males within groups, with one species forming multi-male, multifemale groups in a multilevel society, and in some populations supergroups form exceeding 500 individuals. There appears to be a dominant male, whilst there is no clear dominance among female members. Relationships among females are considered to be resident-egalitarian, as there is low competition and aggression between them within their own groups. Juveniles are treated as a lower-rank (in regards to authority) than subadults and likewise when comparing subadults to adults. Colobuses do not display any type of seasonal breeding patterns.

As suggested by their common names, adult Colobus have black fur with white features. White fur surrounds their facial region and a "U" shape of long white fur runs along the sides of their body. Newborn Colobus are completely white with a pink face. Cases of allomothering, whereby members of the troop other than the infant's biological mother care for it, are documented. Allomothering is believed to increase inclusive fitness or maternal practice for the benefit of future offspring.

=== Social behaviours ===
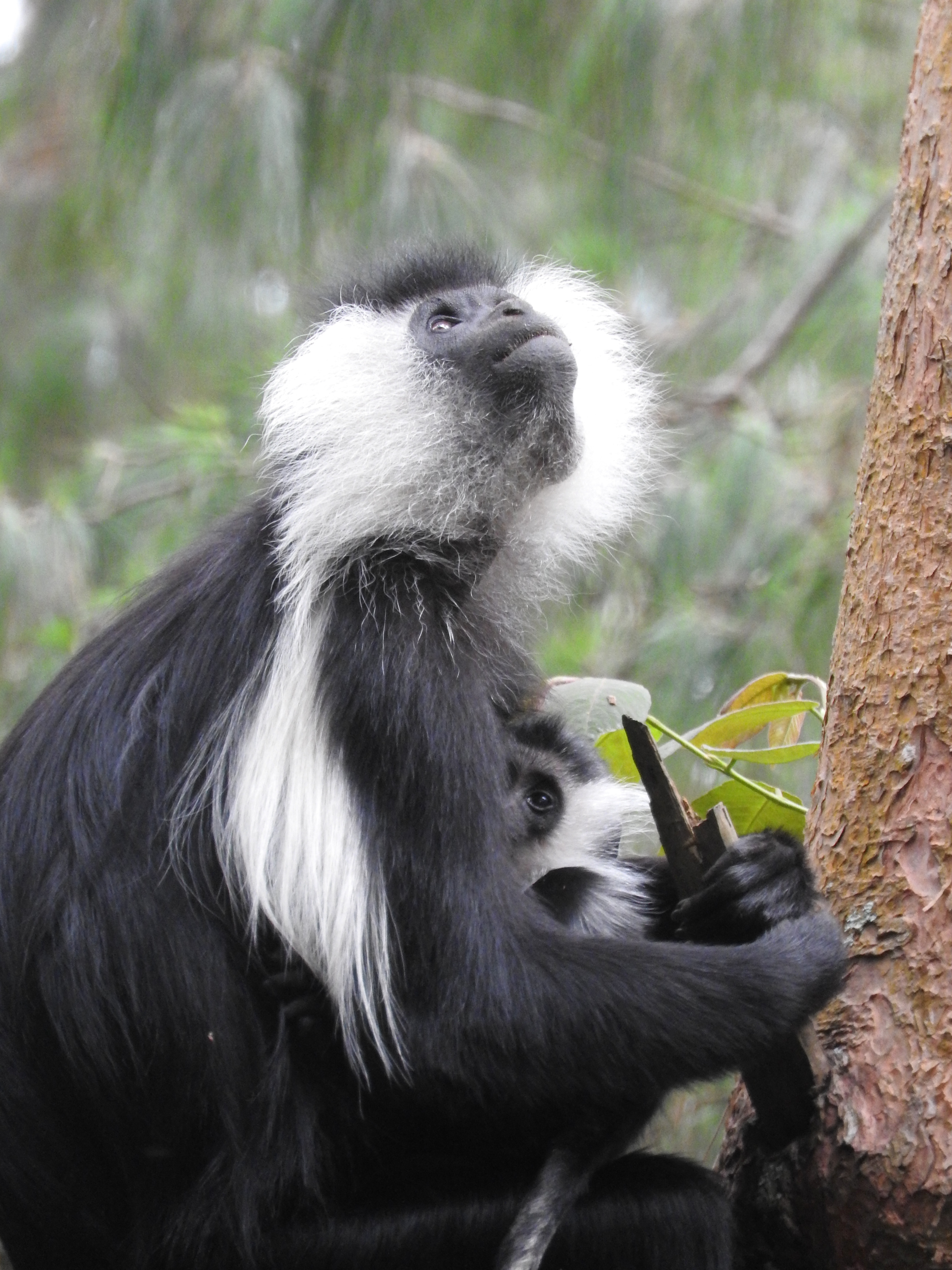
Angolan black-and-white colobus with infant.

Many members participate in a greeting ritual when they are reunited with familiar individuals, an act of reaffirming. The greeting behaviour is generally carried out by the approaching monkey and often is followed with grooming. They participate in three greeting behaviours of physical contact. This includes mounting, head mounting (grasps the shoulders) and embracing. It seems as though these behaviours do not have any relationship with mating or courting.

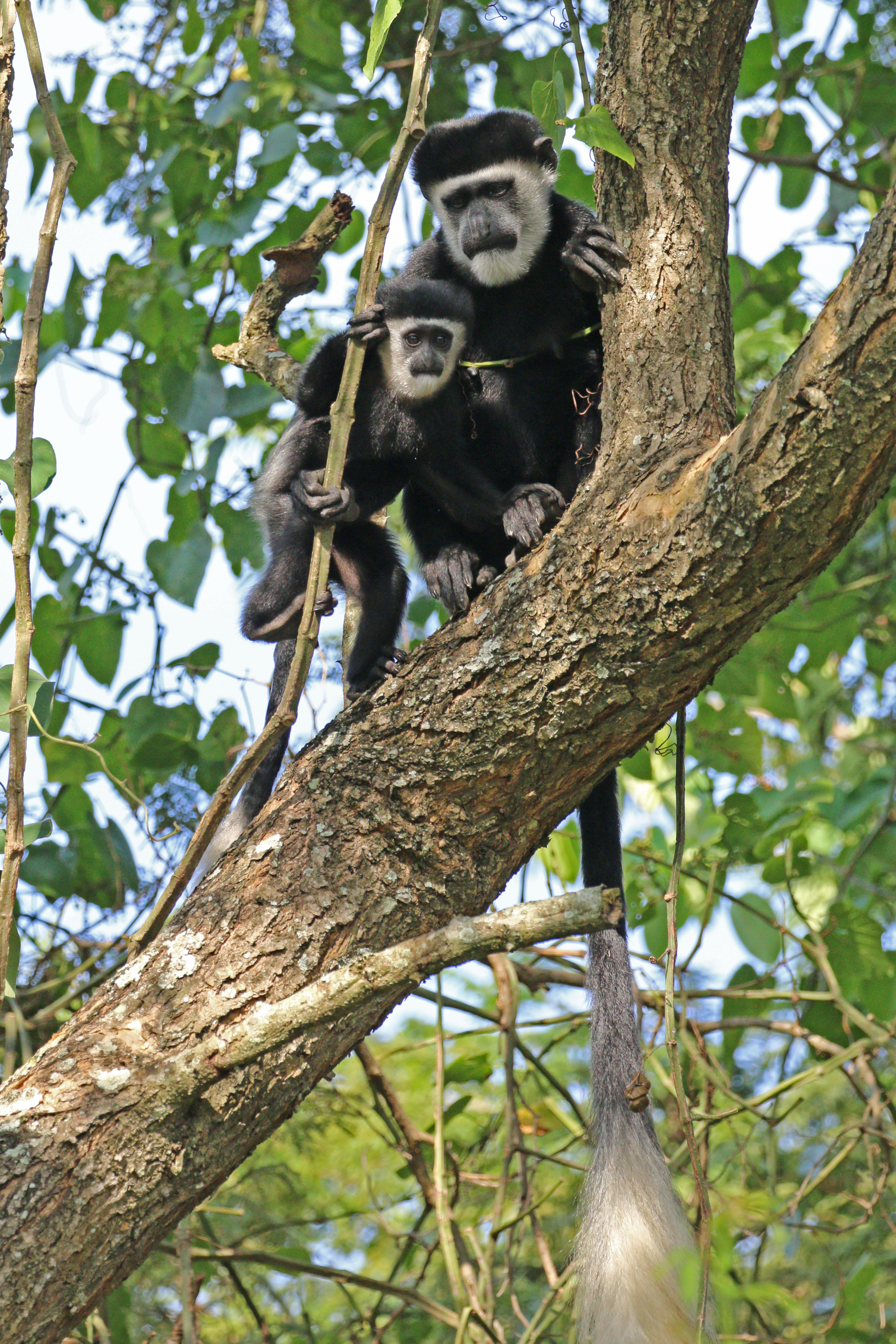
Adult eastern black-and-white colobus with a juvenile

Black-and-white colobus have complex sleeping patterns. They sleep in trees near a food source, which may serve to save energy. Groups seem to regularly switch up sleeping locations (suggested due to reducing risk of parasites and placement prediction) and generally do not sleep near other groups. They also tend to sleep more tightly together on nights with great visibility. They sleep in mid- to upper sections of tall trees which allows for predator watch as well as protection from ground and aerial predators while they are asleep. Although there is no obvious preference for tree type, they have often been observed in Antiaris toxicaria.

== Conservation ==
Colobus species are prey for many forest predators such as leopards and chimpanzees, and are threatened by hunting for the bushmeat trade, logging, and habitat destruction.

Individuals are more vigilant (conspecific threat) in low canopy, they also spend less time scanning when they are around familiar group members as opposed to unfamiliar. There exists no clear difference in vigilance between male and females. However, there is a positive correlation between mean monthly vigilance and encounter rates. Male vigilance generally increases during mating.

== Sources ==
- Kingdon, Jonathan (2015). The Kingdon Field Guide to African Mammals (Second ed.). Bloomsbury Publishing. ISBN 978-1-4729-2531-2.
