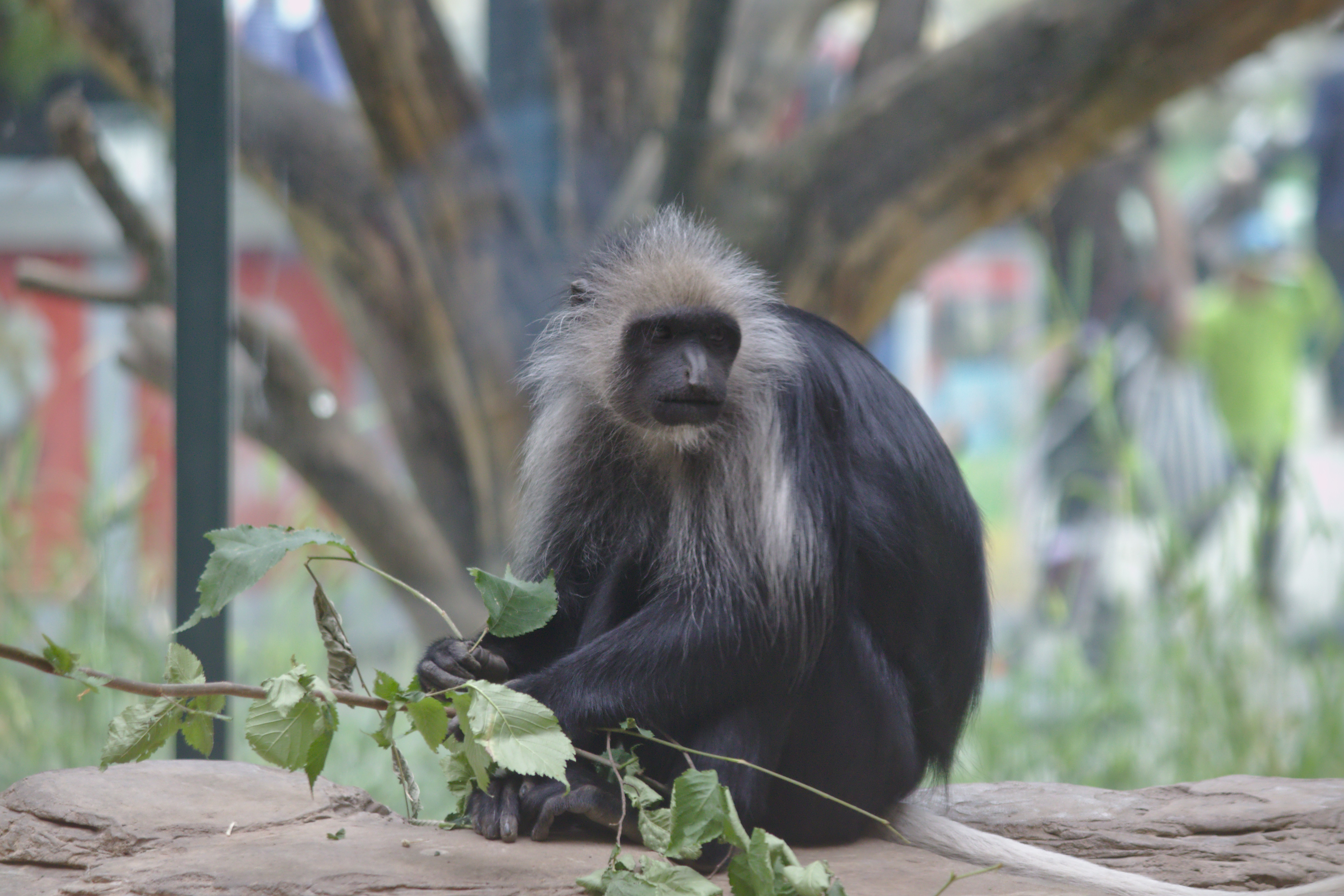
- In the Schönbrunn Zoo in Vienna, Austria

Conservation status
- Endangered (IUCN 3.1)

Scientific classification
- Kingdom: Animalia
- Phylum: Chordata
- Class: Mammalia
- Order: Primates
- Family: Cercopithecidae
- Genus: Colobus
- Species: C. polykomos

Binomial name
- Colobus polykomos (Zimmermann, 1780)
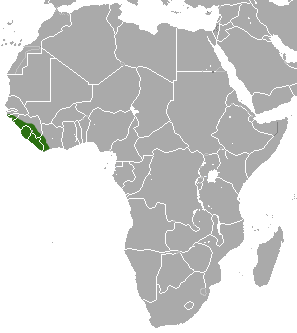
- King colobus range

= King colobus =

Species of Old World monkey

The king colobus (Colobus polykomos), also known as the western black-and-white colobus, is a species of Old World monkey, found in lowland and mountain rainforests in a region stretching from Senegal, through Guinea-Bissau, Guinea, Sierra Leone and Liberia to the Ivory Coast. One of five members of the genus Colobus, the black-and-white colobuses, the king colobus is the westernmost species of the group on the continent of Africa. It eats mainly leaves, but also fruits and flowers. Though it is arboreal, it eats primarily on the ground. It lives in small groups consisting of 3 to 4 females and 1 to 3 males, plus their young. These groups maintain distance from one another through territorial calling.

== Etymology ==
The word 'Colobus' comes from the Greek word for 'mutilated', as all colobus monkeys only have a short stump where the thumb would be. The word 'poly' comes from the Greek word for 'many.' The word 'komos' comes from the Greek celebration of unrestrained singing. A possible subspecies known as C. p. dollmani can be found but is most likely a hybrid with C. vellerosus.

== Characteristics ==
The male king colobus grows to a head-and-body length of 67 cm (26 in), with a tail of between 63 and 90 cm (25 and 35 in). The female is slightly smaller. Males weigh an average of 9.9 kg (22 lb) and females weigh an average of 8.3 kg (18 lb).

The body is black, the limbs and fingers are long and the tail is white. There is a fringe of silvery hair around the face as well as long white "epaulettes" on its shoulders. The king colobus can be distinguished from other members of the Colobus genus by the placement of its white markings. The king colobus has white only on its whiskers, chest, and tail, and its tail is not covered by a tuft.

== Distribution and habitat ==
The king colobus monkey is found in lowland and montane tropical rainforests. The region in which they inhabit is limited to a small range on the Ivory Coast up to Gambia. They can also be found in Senegal, through Guinea-Bissau, Guinea, Sierra Leone and Liberia. Much of the habitat of the king colobus has been destroyed by humans for farming and secondary forests have begun to fill in this area. The forest habitats experiences significant dry seasons and two rainfall peaks. This area is dominated by leguminous trees.

== Behaviour and ecology ==
Diet consists mainly of arboreal leaves, but includes fruit and flowers depending on the season. It can be found foraging on the ground and typically stays within a foraging path of approximately 500 m (1,600 ft).

It lives in small groups of less than 4 females and 1 to 3 males. Unlike males, females interact closely: males rarely interact and try to show dominance. Either males or both sexes will disperse from family groups.

The king colobus have an average home range of 22 hectares with some overlap between groups. Groups rarely encounter other groups of the same species but when they do, males engage in aggressive displays. Territorial calling is a common form of aggression but can also be a warning to the group of predators.

King colobus have been shown to live approximately 23.5 years in captivity and possibly around 30 years in the wild.

=== Reproduction ===
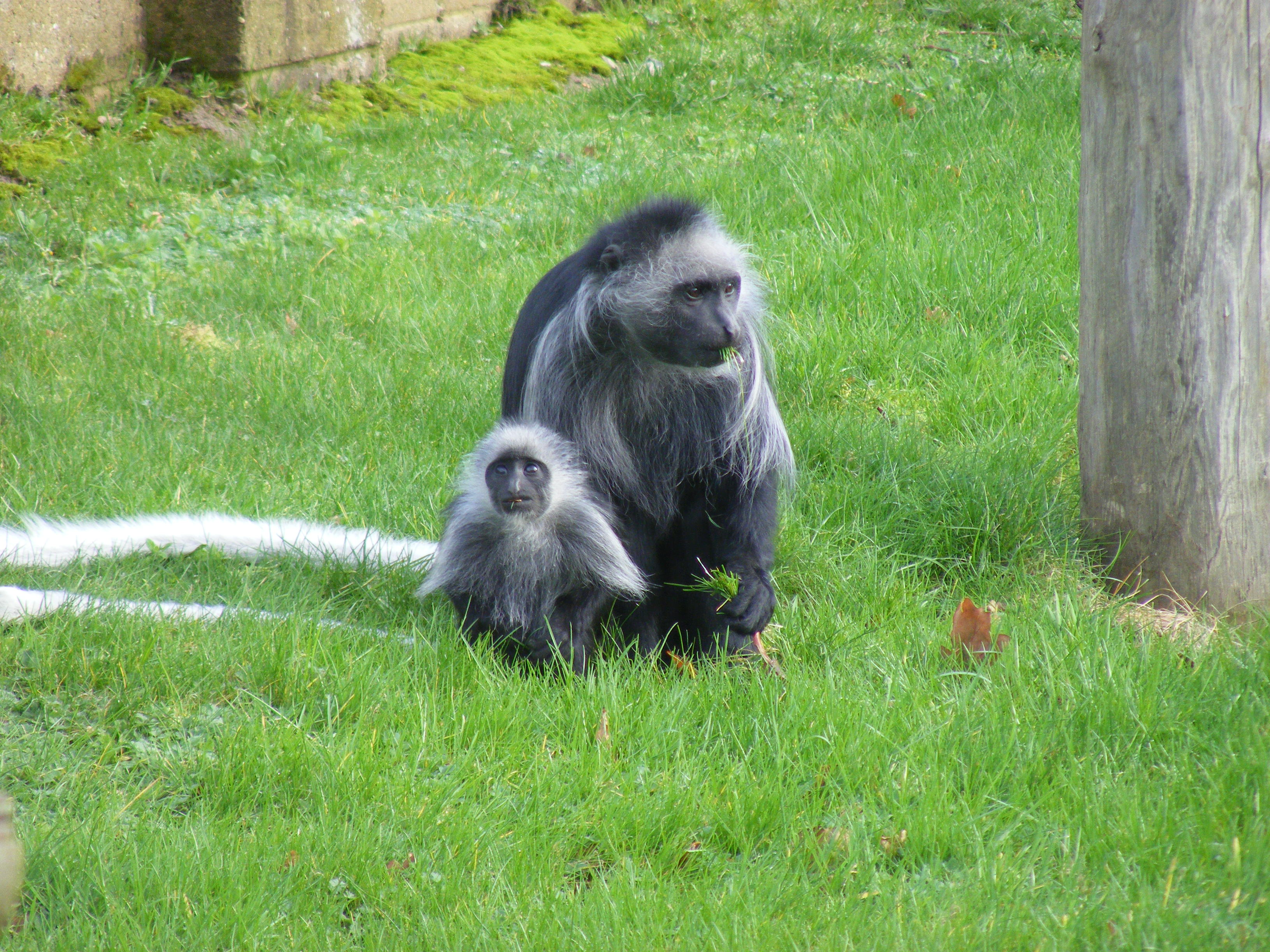
Adult and young

The king colobus live in a single male (polygynous) and multi-male (polygynandrous) mating system. Some groups have shown year round births while others have shown births in relation to the dry seasons. The average gestation period is 175 days and the females produce 1 offspring every 20 months. Both males and females reach sexual maturity at approximately 730 days or 2 years. Females provide the parental care by providing milk, grooming, protection and carry the newborns as they cannot walk immediately.

== Status and conservation ==
The king colobus has a moderate-sized range; it used to be a common and widespread species but numbers have declined over the last few decades. The main cause for the decline is hunting which is threatening and fragmenting populations. In the 19th century the king colobus was hunted for its fur. There is also a continuing decline in the quality and quantity of the forested habitat where it lives; it seems to be largely restricted to primary forest and gallery forest, although it sometimes visits secondary forest. The International Union for Conservation of Nature has rated its conservation status as being endangered. Focus has been on managing the habitats to prevent further degradation and habitat destruction that could harm the species. The species is also maintained as part of an EAZA ex situ captive breeding programme by several European zoos.
