= List of mammals of Zanzibar =

The following mammal species have been recorded in Zanzibar and Pemba islands of eastern coast of Tanzania Archipelago. The first detailed work on mammalian diversity of these two islands was done from 1942 to 1983. Out of 53 mammals found in Zanzibar, 17 species are found only in Zanzibar islands, whereas 6 species are restricted to Pemba Island and 17 others found in both islands. Seven introduced species such as mongooses, pigs and rat species are also abundant.

The following tags are used to highlight each species' conservation status as assessed by the International Union for Conservation of Nature:

| EX | Extinct | No reasonable doubt that the last individual has died. |
| EW | Extinct in the wild | Known only to survive in captivity or as a naturalized population well outside its historic range. |
| CR | Critically endangered | The species is facing an extremely high risk of extinction in the wild. |
| EN | Endangered | The species is facing a very high risk of extinction in the wild. |
| VU | Vulnerable | The species is facing a high risk of extinction in the wild. |
| NT | Near threatened | The species does not currently qualify as being at high risk of extinction but it is likely to do so in the future. |
| LC | Least concern | The species is not currently at risk of extinction in the wild. |
| DD | Data deficient | There is inadequate information to assess the risk of extinction for this species. |

The mammals restricted only to Pemba Island are highlighted by P.

== Order: Eulipotyphla (shrews) ==
The order Eulipotyphla contains the shrews of southern Africa and the shrew moles, comprising four living families of small mammals that were traditionally part of the order Insectivora.

- Family: Soricidae (musk shrews)
  - Subfamily: Crocidurinae
    - Genus: Crocidura
      - Greater red musk shrew, Crocidura flavescens ssp. nyansae LC
      - Bicolored musk shrew, Crocidura fuscomurina ssp. sansibarica LC
      - Savanna path shrew, Crocidura viaria ssp. suahelae LC
    - Genus: Suncus
      - Asian house shrew, Suncus murinus LC

== Order: Macroscelidea (elephant shrews) ==
Often called elephant shrews or jumping shrews are native to southern Africa.

- Family: Macroscelididae (elephant-shrews)
  - Genus: Rhynchocyon
    - Black and rufous sengi, Rhynchocyon petersi ssp. adersi VU

== Order: Chiroptera (bats) ==
Bats are the only true fliers among the mammals. They fly using the membranous skin attached to their elongated fingers. The species are found across the globe and account for 20% of mammals described.

- Family: Pteropodidae (flying foxes, Old World fruit bats)
  - Subfamily: Pteropodinae
    - Genus: Eidolon
      - Straw-coloured fruit bat, Eidolon helvum ssp. helvum LC
    - Genus: Epomophorus
      - Minor epauletted fruit bat, Epomophorus minor LC
      - Wahlberg's epauletted fruit bat, Epomophorus wahlbergi ssp. wahlbergi LC
    - Genus: Pteropus
      - Pemba flying fox, Pteropus voeltzkowi VU - P
    - Genus: Rousettus
      - Egyptian fruit bat, Rousettus aegyptiacus ssp. leachii LC
- Family: Vespertilionidae
  - Subfamily: Vespertilioninae
    - Genus: Neoromicia
      - Cape serotine, Neoromicia capensis ssp. grandidieri LC
      - Banana pipistrelle, Neoromicia nanus ssp. nanus LC
    - Genus: Scotophilus
      - Lesser yellow bat, Scotophilus borbonicus DD
      - Schreber's yellow bat, Scotophilus nigrita NT
- Family: Emballonuridae
  - Genus: Coleura
    - African sheath-tailed bat, Coleura afra LC - P
  - Genus: Taphozous
    - Mauritian tomb bat, Taphozous mauritianus LC
- Family: Nycteridae
  - Genus: Nycteris
    - Large slit-faced bat, Nycteris grandis LC
    - Hairy slit-faced bat, Nycteris hispida LC
    - Large-eared slit-faced bat, Nycteris macrotis ssp. luteola LC
    - Egyptian slit-faced bat, Nycteris thebaica LC
- Family: Megadermatidae
  - Genus: Cardioderma
    - Heart-nosed bat, Cardioderma cor LC
  - Genus: Lavia
    - Yellow-winged bat, Lavia frons LC
- Family: Rhinolophidae
  - Subfamily: Rhinolophinae
    - Genus: Rhinolophus
      - Decken's horseshoe bat, Rhinolophus deckenii DD
      - Swinny's horseshoe bat, Rhinolophus swinnyi NT
  - Subfamily: Hipposiderinae
    - Genus: Hipposideros
      - Sundevall's roundleaf bat, Hipposideros caffer ssp. caffer LC
      - Commerson's leaf-nosed bat, Hipposideros commersoni ssp. marungensis NT
- Family: Molossidae
  - Genus: Mops
    - Sierra Leone free-tailed bat, Mops brachypterus LC
  - Genus: Chaerephon
    - Little free-tailed bat, Chaerephon pumilus LC

== Order: Primates ==
The order Primates contains humans and their closest relatives ranging from lemurs, lorisoids, and tarsiers, to monkeys and great apes. One of the most intelligent groups of mammals, they are well distributed around Africa, South America and Asia with more than 100 described species.

- Suborder: Strepsirrhini
  - Infraorder: Lemuriformes
    - Superfamily: Lorisoidea
      - Family: Galagidae
        - Genus: Galagoides
          - Zanzibar bushbaby, Galagoides zanzibaricus LR/nt
        - Genus: Otolemur
          - Northern greater galago, Otolemur garnettii ssp. garnettii LR/lc
- Suborder: Haplorhini
  - Infraorder: Simiiformes
    - Parvorder: Catarrhini
      - Superfamily: Cercopithecoidea
        - Family: Cercopithecidae (Old World monkeys)
          - Genus: Chlorocebus
            - Vervet monkey, Chlorocebus pygerythrus ssp. nesiotes LR/lc - P
            - Blue monkey, Cercopithecus mitis ssp. albogularis LR/lc
          - Subfamily: Colobinae
            - Genus: Procolobus
              - Zanzibar red colobus, Procolobus kirkii EN
      - Superfamily: Hominoidea
        - Family: Hominidae
          - Subfamily: Homininae
            - Tribe: Hominini
              - Genus: Homo
                - Human, Homo sapiens ssp. sapiens LC

== Order: Carnivora (carnivorans) ==
Well over 250 species of carnivorans, they are the supreme specialists which fill up the highest ranks in food webs.

- Suborder: Feliformia
  - Family: Felidae (cats)
    - Subfamily: Pantherinae
      - Genus: Panthera
        - Leopard, P. pardus
          - Zanzibar leopard, P. p. pardus possibly EX
  - Family: Herpestidae (mongooses)
    - Genus: Atilax
      - Marsh mongoose, Atilax paludinosus ssp. rubescens LR/lc - P
    - Genus: Bdeogale
      - Bushy-tailed mongoose, Bdeogale crassicauda ssp. tenuis LR/lc
    - Genus: Galerella
      - Slender mongoose, Galerella sanguinea LR/lc
    - Genus: Mungos
      - Banded mongoose, Mungos mungo LR/lc
  - Family: Viverridae (civets, mongooses, etc.)
    - Subfamily: Viverrinae
      - Genus: Genetta
      - Servaline genet, Genetta servalina
        - Zanzibar servaline genet, G. s. archeri
      - Genus: Civettictis
        - African civet, Civettictis civetta LR/lc

== Order: Hyracoidea (hyraxes) ==
Hyraxes are small, herbivorous mammals in the order Hyracoidea, which included 4 living species.

- Family: Procaviidae (hyraxes)
  - Genus: Dendrohyrax
    - Southern tree hyrax, Dendrohyrax arboreus LC

== Order: Artiodactyla (even-toed ungulates) ==
The Artiodactyls are even-toed ungulates. There are about 220 artiodactyl species, including many that are of great economic importance to humans, such as cattle, and antelopes.

- Family: Suidae (pigs)
  - Subfamily: Suinae
    - Genus: Potamochoerus
      - Bushpig, Potamochoerus larvatus LR/lc
    - Genus: Sus
      - Wild boar, Sus scrofa LR/lc
- Family: Bovidae (cattle, antelope, sheep, goats)
    - Genus: Cephalophus
      - Aders's duiker, Cephalophus adersi CR
      - Blue duiker, Cephalophus monticola ssp. sundavalli LR/lc
    - Genus: Neotragus
      - Suni, Neotragus moschatus LC

== Order: Rodentia (rodents) ==
Rodents make up the largest order of mammals, with over 40% of mammalian species. They have ever growing two incisors in the upper and lower jaw.

- Suborder: Hystricognathi
  - Family: Sciuridae (squirrels)
    - Subfamily: Xerinae
      - Tribe: Protoxerini
        - Genus: Heliosciurus
          - Zanj sun squirrel, Heliosciurus undulatus DD
          - Red bush squirrel, Paraxerus palliatus ssp. frerei LC
  - Family: Muridae (mice, rats, voles, gerbils, hamsters, etc.)
    - Subfamily: Murinae
      - Genus: Cricetomys
        - Gambian pouched rat, Cricetomys gambianus ssp. cosensi LC
      - Genus: Mus
        - House mouse, Mus musculus ssp. gentilis LC
        - Brown rat, Rattus norvegicus LC
        - Black rat, Rattus rattus LC

== See also ==
- List of chordate orders
- Lists of mammals by region
- Mammal classification
- List of mammals described in the 2000s
