= List of mammals of Eritrea =

This is a list of the mammal species recorded in Eritrea. Of the mammal species in Eritrea, one is critically endangered, two are endangered, ten are vulnerable, and three are near threatened.

The following tags are used to highlight each species' conservation status as assessed by the International Union for Conservation of Nature:

EX	Extinct	No reasonable doubt that the last individual has died.
EW	Extinct in the wild	Known only to survive in captivity or as a naturalized populations well outside its previous range.
CR	Critically endangered	The species is in imminent risk of extinction in the wild.
EN	Endangered	The species is facing an extremely high risk of extinction in the wild.
VU	Vulnerable	The species is facing a high risk of extinction in the wild.
NT	Near threatened	The species does not meet any of the criteria that would categorise it as risking extinction but it is likely to do so in the future.
LC	Least concern	There are no current identifiable risks to the species.
DD	Data deficient	There is inadequate information to make an assessment of the risks to this species.

Some species were assessed using an earlier set of criteria. Species assessed using this system have the following instead of near threatened and least concern categories:

LR/cd	Lower risk/conservation dependent	Species which were the focus of conservation programmes and may have moved into a higher risk category if that programme was discontinued.
LR/nt	Lower risk/near threatened	Species which are close to being classified as vulnerable but are not the subject of conservation programmes.
LR/lc	Lower risk/least concern	Species for which there are no identifiable risks.

== Order: Tubulidentata (aardvarks) ==
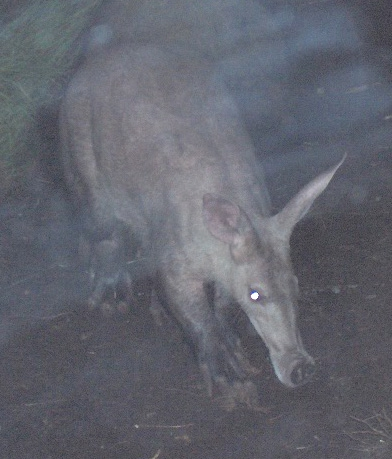
Aardvark

The order Tubulidentata consists of a single species, the aardvark. Tubulidentata are characterised by their teeth which lack a pulp cavity and form thin tubes which are continuously worn down and replaced.

- Family: Orycteropodidae
  - Genus: Orycteropus
    - Aardvark, O. afer LC

== Order: Hyracoidea (hyraxes) ==
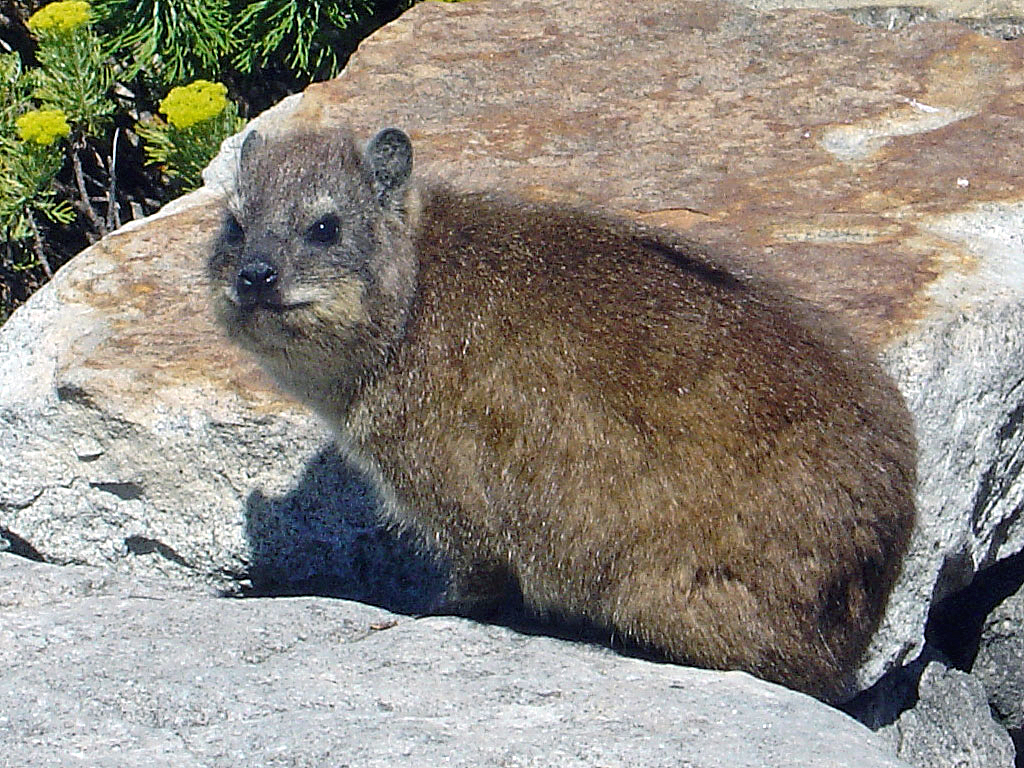
Cape hyrax

The hyraxes are any of four species of fairly small, thickset, herbivorous mammals in the order Hyracoidea. About the size of a domestic cat they are well-furred, with rounded bodies and a stumpy tail. They are native to Africa and the Middle East.

- Family: Procaviidae (hyraxes)
  - Genus: Heterohyrax
    - Yellow-spotted rock hyrax, Heterohyrax brucei LC
  - Genus: Procavia
    - Cape hyrax, Procavia capensis LC

== Order: Proboscidea (elephants) ==
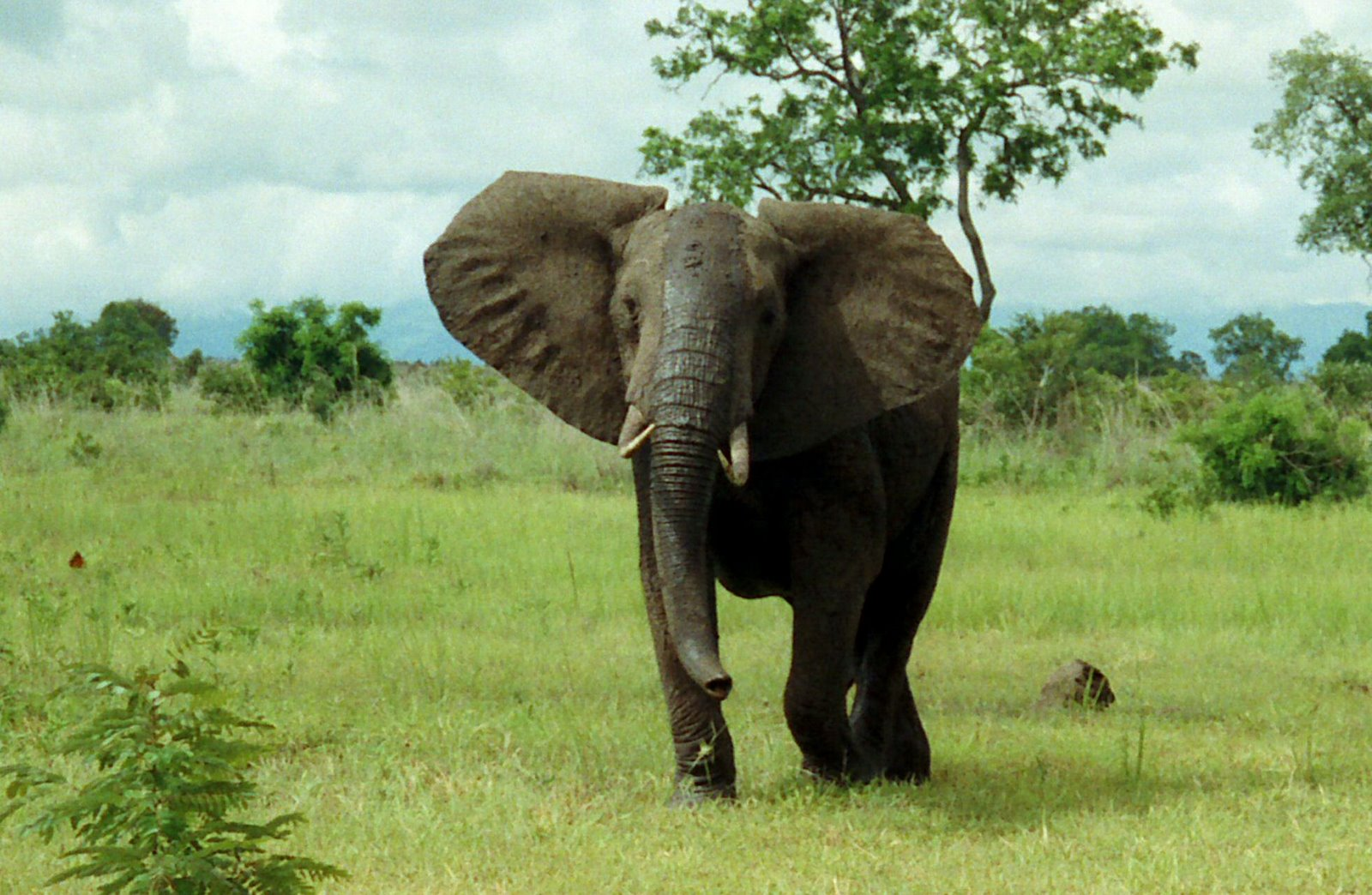
African bush elephant

The elephants comprise three living species and are the largest living land animals.

- Family: Elephantidae (elephants)
  - Genus: Loxodonta
    - African bush elephant, L. africana EN

== Order: Sirenia (manatees and dugongs) ==
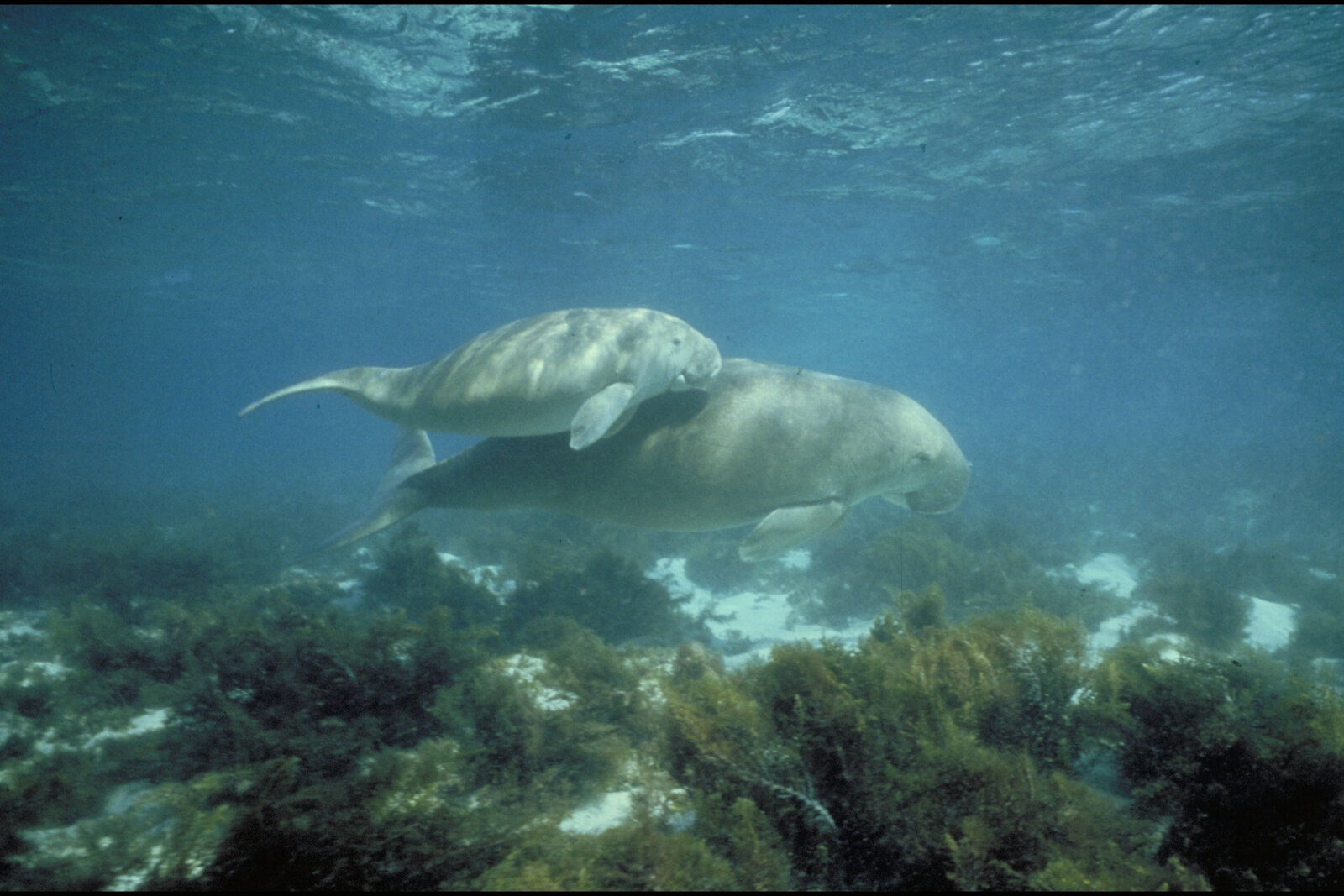
Dugongs

Sirenia is an order of fully aquatic, herbivorous mammals that inhabit rivers, estuaries, coastal marine waters, swamps, and marine wetlands. All four species are endangered.

- Family: Dugongidae
  - Genus: Dugong
    - Dugong, Dugong dugon VU

== Order: Primates ==
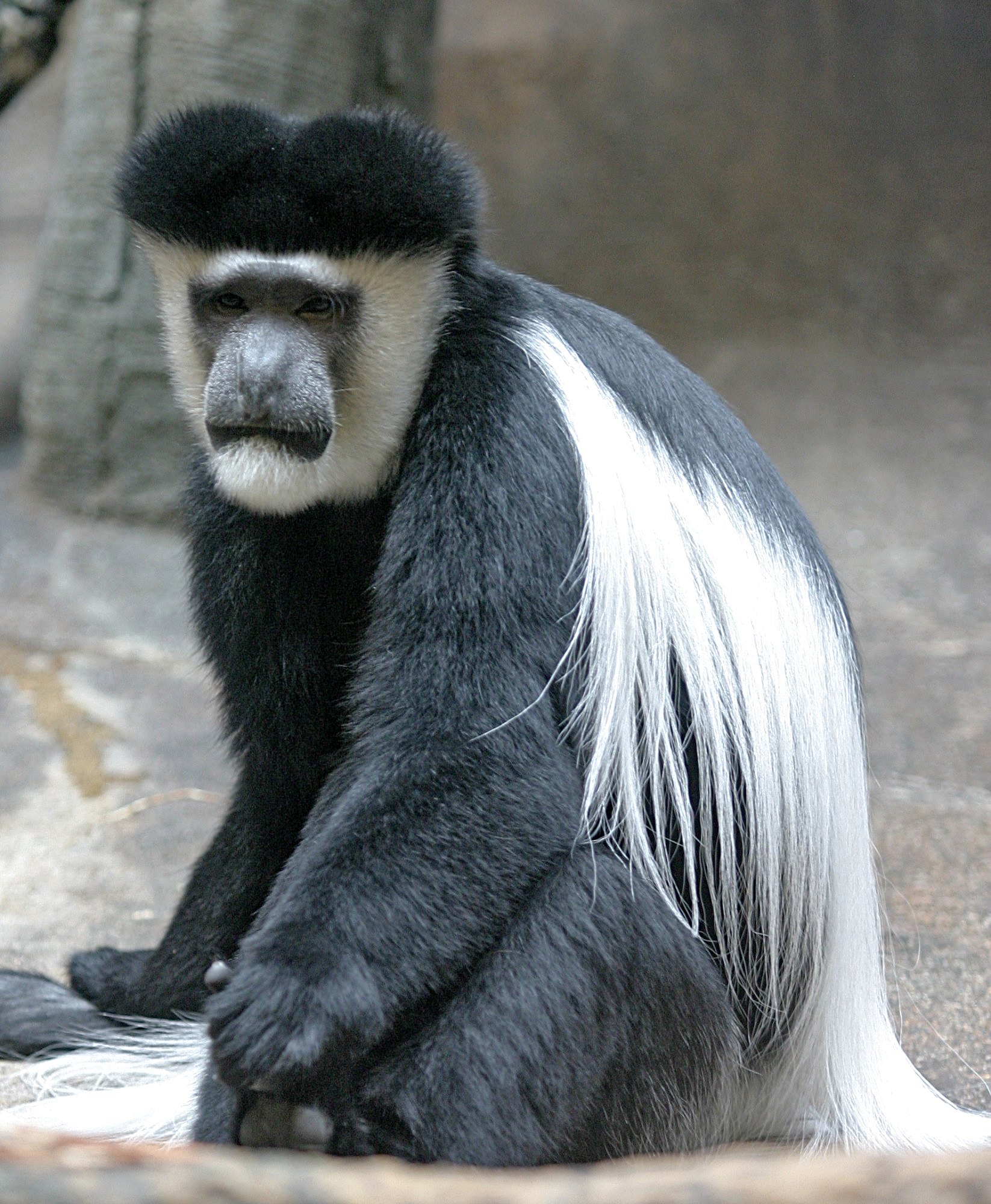
Mantled guereza

The order Primates contains humans and their closest relatives: lemurs, lorisoids, tarsiers, monkeys, and apes.

- Suborder: Strepsirrhini
  - Infraorder: Lemuriformes
    - Superfamily: Lorisoidea
      - Family: Galagidae
        - Genus: Galago
          - Senegal bushbaby, Galago senegalensis LR/lc
- Suborder: Haplorhini
  - Infraorder: Simiiformes
    - Parvorder: Catarrhini
      - Superfamily: Cercopithecoidea
        - Family: Cercopithecidae (Old World monkeys)
          - Genus: Chlorocebus
            - Grivet, Chlorocebus aethiops LR/lc
          - Genus: Papio
            - Olive baboon, Papio anubis LR/lc
            - Hamadryas baboon, Papio hamadryas LR/nt
          - Genus: Theropithecus
            - Gelada, Theropithecus gelada LR/nt
        - Subfamily: Colobinae
          - Genus: Colobus
            - Mantled guereza, Colobus guereza LR/lc

== Order: Rodentia (rodents) ==
Rodents make up the largest order of mammals, with over 40% of mammalian species. They have two incisors in the upper and lower jaw which grow continually and must be kept short by gnawing. Most rodents are small though the capybara can weigh up to 45 kg (99 lb).

- Suborder: Hystricognathi
  - Family: Hystricidae (Old World porcupines)
    - Genus: Hystrix
      - Crested porcupine, Hystrix cristata LC
- Suborder: Sciurognathi
  - Family: Sciuridae (squirrels)
    - Subfamily: Xerinae
      - Tribe: Xerini
        - Genus: Xerus
          - Striped ground squirrel, Xerus erythropus LC
          - Unstriped ground squirrel, Xerus rutilus LC
      - Tribe: Protoxerini
        - Genus: Heliosciurus
          - Gambian sun squirrel, Heliosciurus gambianus LC
  - Family: Gliridae (dormice)
    - Subfamily: Graphiurinae
      - Genus: Graphiurus
        - Small-eared dormouse, Graphiurus microtis LC
  - Family: Dipodidae (jerboas)
    - Subfamily: Dipodinae
      - Genus: Jaculus
        - Lesser Egyptian jerboa, Jaculus jaculus LC
  - Family: Cricetidae
    - Subfamily: Lophiomyinae
      - Genus: Lophiomys
        - Maned rat, Lophiomys imhausi LC
  - Family: Muridae (mice, rats, voles, gerbils, hamsters, etc.)
    - Subfamily: Deomyinae
      - Genus: Acomys
        - Mullah spiny mouse, Acomys mullah LC
    - Subfamily: Gerbillinae
      - Genus: Gerbillus
        - Somalia gerbil, Gerbillus dunni DD
      - Genus: Tatera
        - Fringe-tailed gerbil, Tatera robusta LC
    - Subfamily: Murinae
      - Genus: Arvicanthis
        - Abyssinian grass rat, Arvicanthis abyssinicus LC
        - African grass rat, Arvicanthis niloticus LC
      - Genus: Mus
        - Delicate mouse, Mus tenellus LC
      - Genus: Stenocephalemys
        - Ethiopian white-footed mouse, Stenocephalemys albipes LC
  - Family: Ctenodactylidae
    - Genus: Pectinator
      - Speke's pectinator, Pectinator spekei DD

== Order: Lagomorpha (lagomorphs) ==
The lagomorphs comprise two families, Leporidae (hares and rabbits), and Ochotonidae (pikas). Though they can resemble rodents, and were classified as a superfamily in that order until the early 20th century, they have since been considered a separate order. They differ from rodents in a number of physical characteristics, such as having four incisors in the upper jaw rather than two.

- Family: Leporidae (rabbits, hares)
  - Genus: Lepus
    - Cape hare, Lepus capensis LR/lc

== Order: Erinaceomorpha (hedgehogs and gymnures) ==
The order Erinaceomorpha contains a single family, Erinaceidae, which comprise the hedgehogs and gymnures. The hedgehogs are easily recognised by their spines while gymnures look more like large rats.

- Family: Erinaceidae (hedgehogs)
  - Subfamily: Erinaceinae
    - Genus: Hemiechinus
      - Desert hedgehog, Hemiechinus aethiopicus LR/lc

== Order: Soricomorpha (shrews, moles, and solenodons) ==
The "shrew-forms" are insectivorous mammals. The shrews and solenodons closely resemble mice while the moles are stout-bodied burrowers.

- Family: Soricidae (shrews)
  - Subfamily: Crocidurinae
    - Genus: Crocidura
      - Savanna shrew, Crocidura fulvastra LC
      - Mauritanian shrew, Crocidura lusitania LC
      - Savanna path shrew, Crocidura viaria LC

== Order: Chiroptera (bats) ==
The bats' most distinguishing feature is that their forelimbs are developed as wings, making them the only mammals capable of flight. Bat species account for about 20% of all mammals.

- Family: Pteropodidae (flying foxes, Old World fruit bats)
  - Subfamily: Pteropodinae
    - Genus: Eidolon
      - Straw-coloured fruit bat, Eidolon helvum LC
    - Genus: Epomophorus
      - Ethiopian epauletted fruit bat, Epomophorus labiatus LC
    - Genus: Rousettus
      - Egyptian fruit bat, Rousettus aegyptiacus LC
- Family: Vespertilionidae
  - Subfamily: Vespertilioninae
    - Genus: Barbastella
      - Asian barbastelle, Barbastella leucomelas LR/lc
    - Genus: Eptesicus
      - Botta's serotine, Eptesicus bottae LC
    - Genus: Neoromicia
      - Cape serotine, Neoromicia capensis LC
      - Banana pipistrelle, Neoromicia nanus LC
      - Somali serotine, Neoromicia somalicus LC
    - Genus: Nycticeinops
      - Schlieffen's bat, Nycticeinops schlieffeni LC
    - Genus: Plecotus
      - Ethiopian big-eared bat, Plecotus balensis VU
    - Genus: Scotophilus
      - African yellow bat, Scotophilus dinganii LC
- Family: Rhinopomatidae
  - Genus: Rhinopoma
    - Egyptian mouse-tailed bat, R. cystops LC
    - Lesser mouse-tailed bat, Rhinopoma hardwickei LC
    - Greater mouse-tailed bat, Rhinopoma microphyllum LC
- Family: Molossidae
  - Genus: Chaerephon
    - Spotted free-tailed bat, Chaerephon bivittata LC
    - Little free-tailed bat, Chaerephon pumila LC
  - Genus: Mops
    - Midas free-tailed bat, Mops midas LC
  - Genus: Tadarida
    - African giant free-tailed bat, Tadarida ventralis NT
- Family: Emballonuridae
  - Genus: Coleura
    - African sheath-tailed bat, Coleura afra LC
  - Genus: Taphozous
    - Naked-rumped tomb bat, Taphozous nudiventris LC
- Family: Nycteridae
  - Genus: Nycteris
    - Egyptian slit-faced bat, Nycteris thebaica LC
- Family: Megadermatidae
  - Genus: Cardioderma
    - Heart-nosed bat, Cardioderma cor LC
  - Genus: Lavia
    - Yellow-winged bat, Lavia frons LC
- Family: Rhinolophidae
  - Subfamily: Rhinolophinae
    - Genus: Rhinolophus
      - Blasius's horseshoe bat, R. blasii LC
      - Geoffroy's horseshoe bat, Rhinolophus clivosus LC
      - Rüppell's horseshoe bat, Rhinolophus fumigatus LC
      - Lesser horseshoe bat, Rhinolophus hipposideros LC
  - Subfamily: Hipposiderinae
    - Genus: Asellia
      - Patrizi's trident leaf-nosed bat, Asellia patrizii VU
      - Trident leaf-nosed bat, Asellia tridens LC
    - Genus: Hipposideros
      - Sundevall's roundleaf bat, Hipposideros caffer LC
      - Ethiopian large-eared roundleaf bat, Hipposideros megalotis NT

== Order: Cetacea (whales) ==
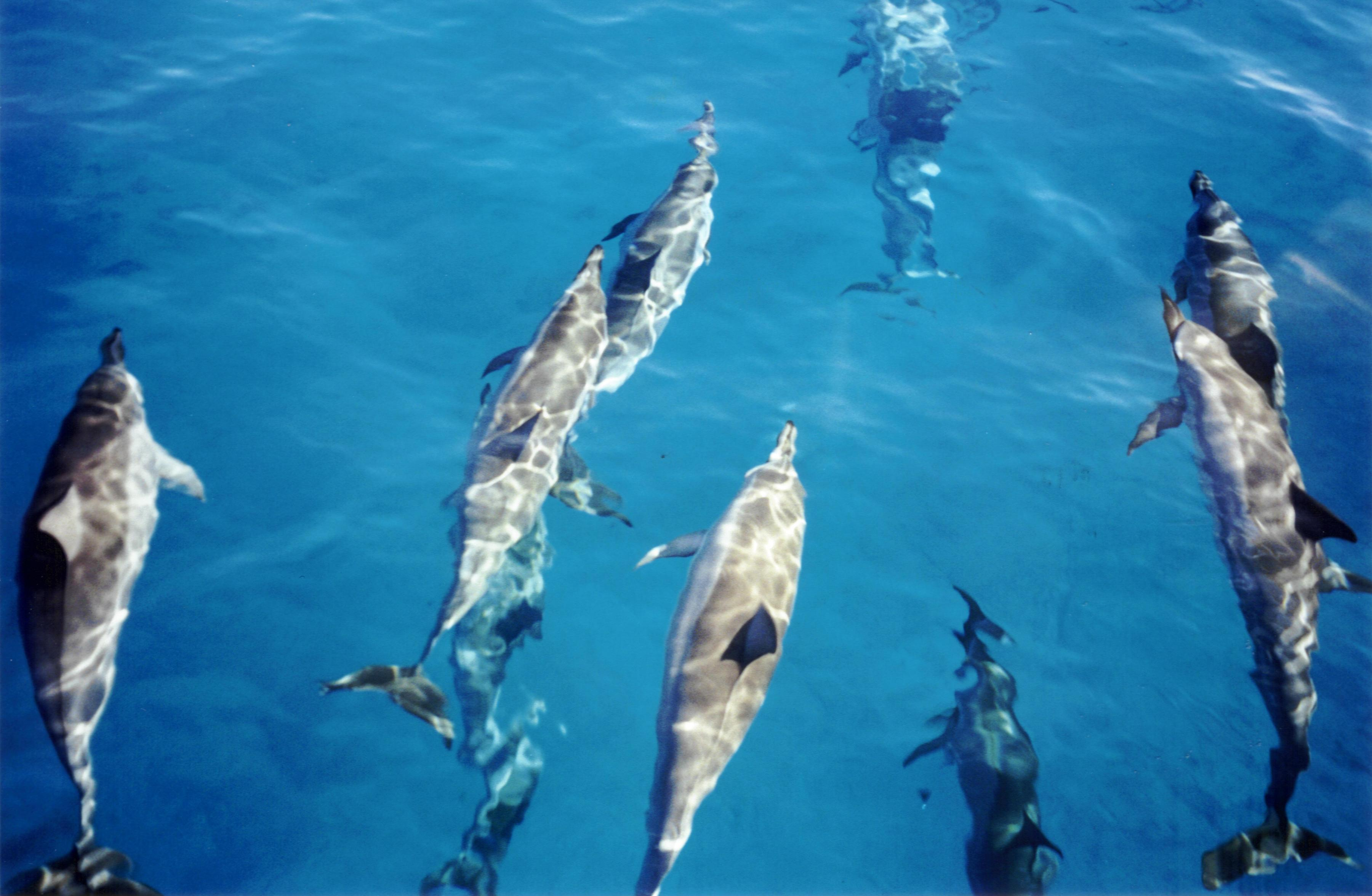
Spinner dolphins

The order Cetacea includes whales, dolphins and porpoises. They are the mammals most fully adapted to aquatic life with a spindle-shaped nearly hairless body, protected by a thick layer of blubber, and forelimbs and tail modified to provide propulsion underwater.

- Suborder: Odontoceti
  - Superfamily: Platanistoidea
    - Family: Delphinidae (marine dolphins)
      - Genus: Delphinus
        - Long-beaked common dolphin, Delphinus capensis DD
      - Genus: Globicephala
        - Short-finned pilot whale, Globicephala macrorhyncus DD
      - Genus: Grampus
        - Risso's dolphin, Grampus griseus DD
      - Genus: Orcinus
        - Killer whale, Orcinus orca DD
      - Genus: Sousa
        - Indian humpback dolphin, Sousa plumbea DD
      - Genus: Stenella
        - Pantropical spotted dolphin, Stenella attenuata DD
        - Striped dolphin, Stenella coeruleoalba DD
        - Spinner dolphin, Stenella longirostris DD
      - Genus: Steno
        - Rough-toothed dolphin, Steno bredanensis DD
      - Genus: Tursiops
        - Common bottlenose dolphin, Tursiops truncatus
        - Indo-Pacific bottlenose dolphin, Tursiops aduncus
  - Superfamily Ziphioidea
    - Family: Ziphidae (beaked whales)
      - Genus: Indopacetus
        - Tropical bottlenose whale, Indopacetus pacificus DD
      - Genus: Mesoplodon
        - Ginkgo-toothed beaked whale, Mesoplodon ginkgodens DD
        - Blainville's beaked whale, Mesoplodon densirostris DD

== Order: Carnivora (carnivorans) ==
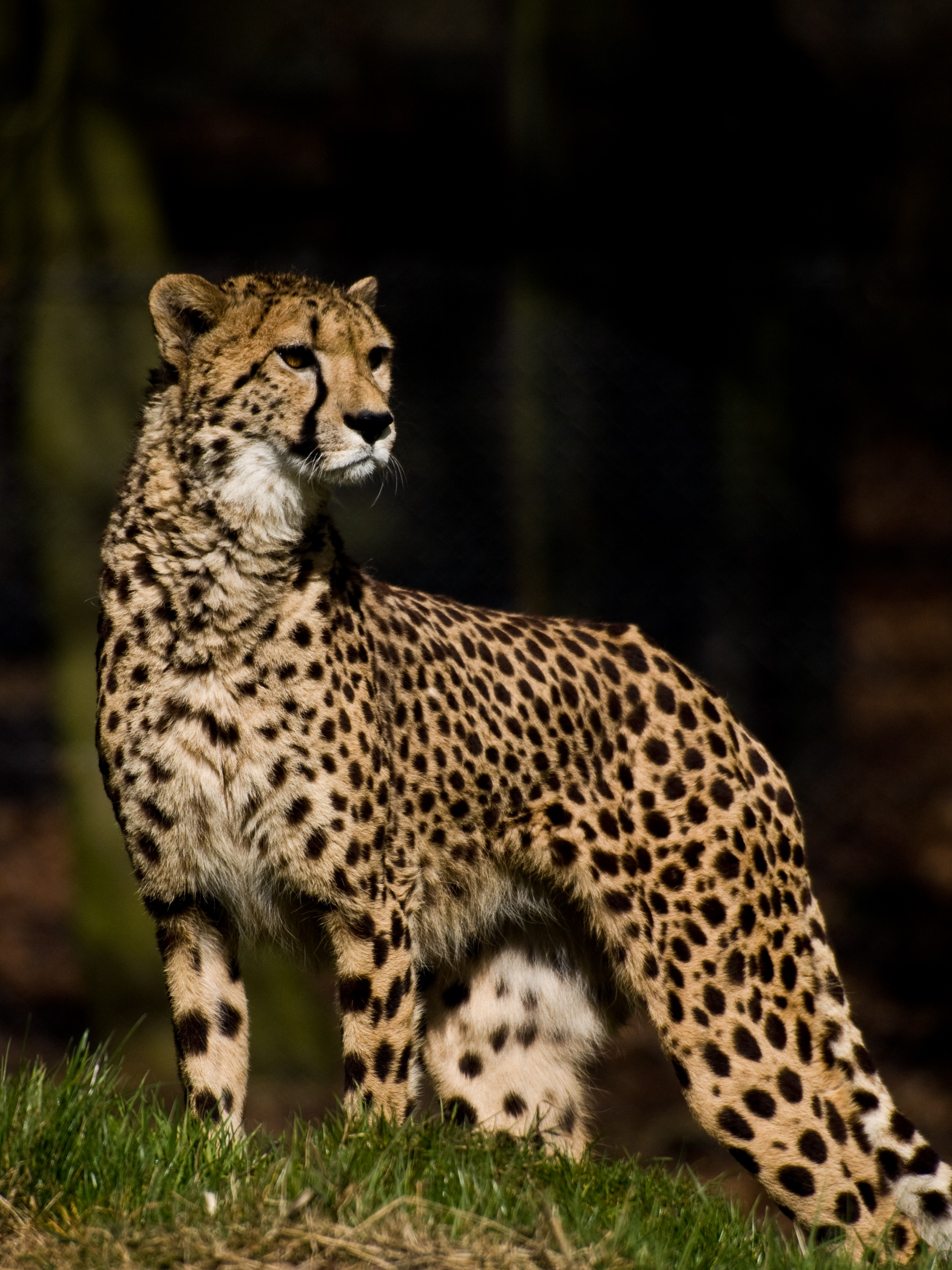
Sudan cheetah

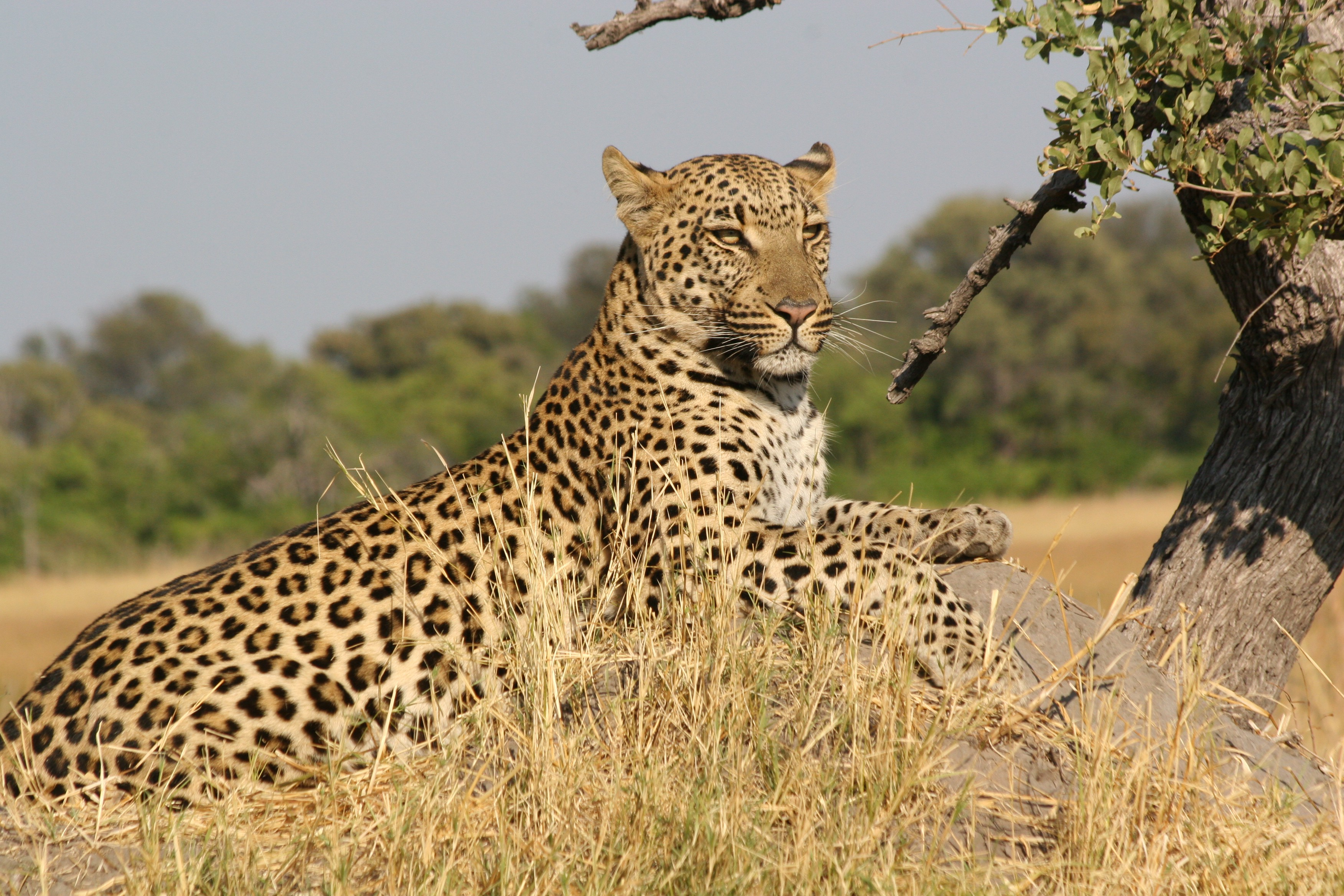
African leopard

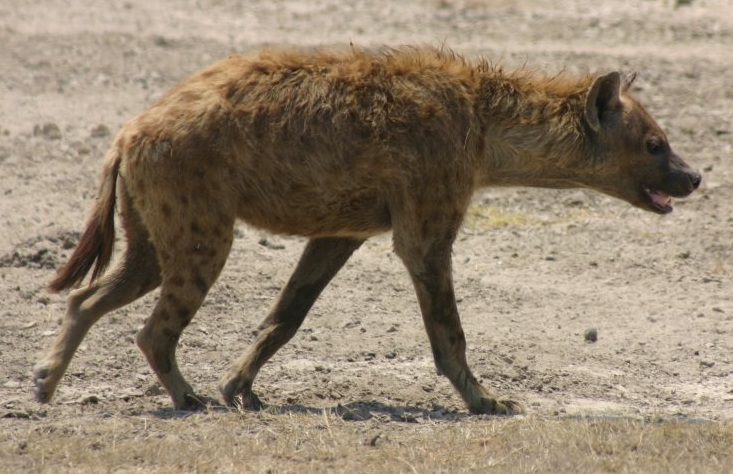
Spotted hyena

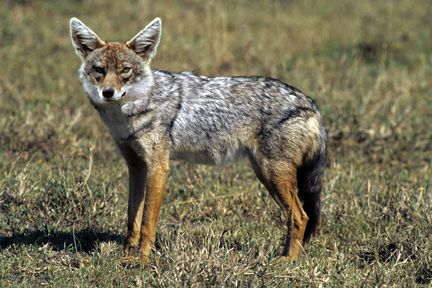
African golden wolf

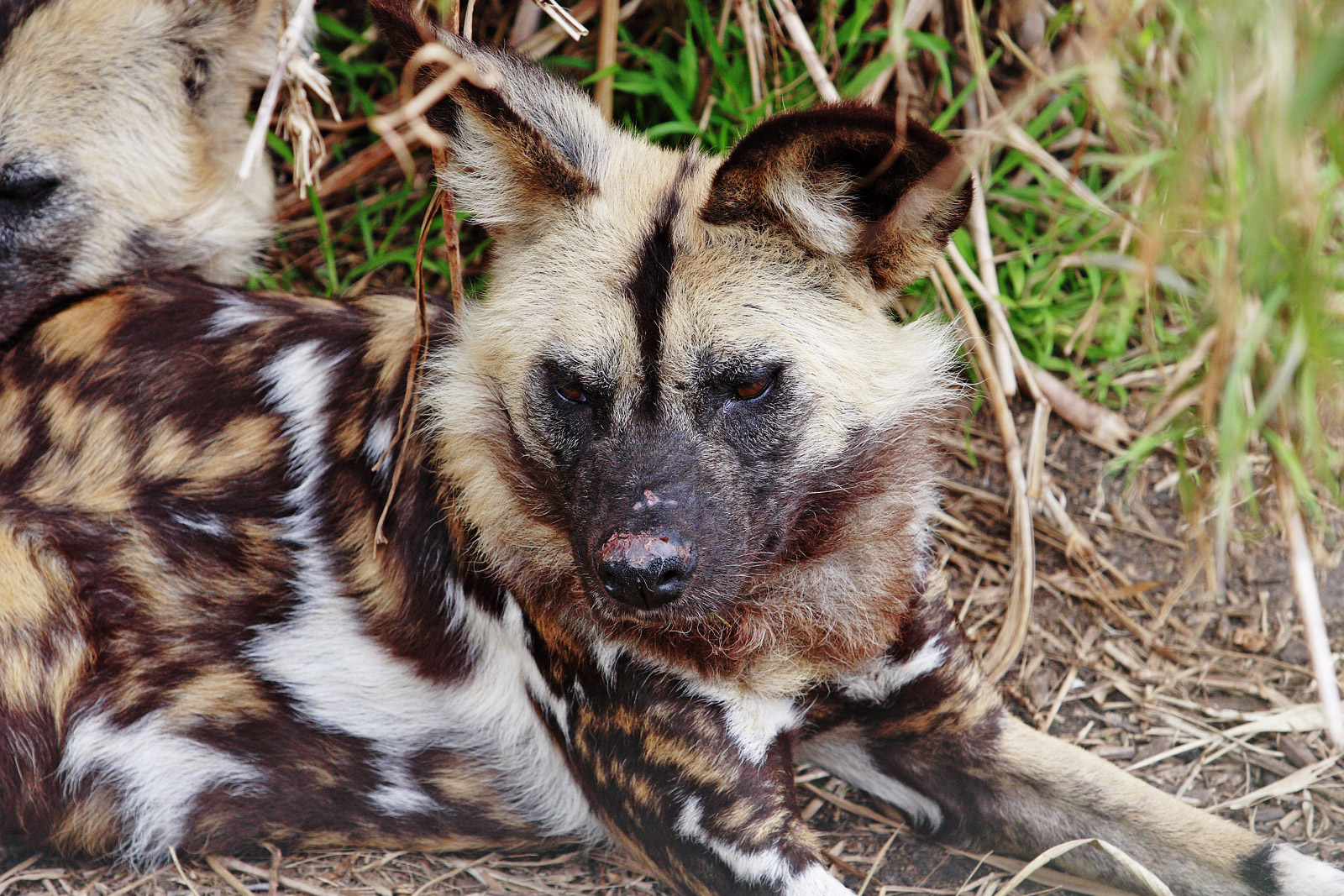
African wild dog

There are over 260 species of carnivorans, the majority of which feed primarily on meat. They have a characteristic skull shape and dentition.

- Suborder: Feliformia
  - Family: Felidae (cats)
    - Subfamily: Felinae
      - Genus: Acinonyx
        - Cheetah, Acinonyx jubatus VU
      - Genus: Caracal
        - Caracal, Caracal caracal LC
      - Genus: Felis
        - African wildcat, Felis lybica LC
      - Genus: Leptailurus
        - Serval, Leptailurus serval LC
    - Subfamily: Pantherinae
      - Genus: Panthera
        - Species: Panthera leo VU
        - Species: Panthera pardus NT
          - African leopard, P. p. pardus
  - Family: Hyaenidae (hyaenas)
    - Genus: Crocuta
      - Spotted hyena, Crocuta crocuta LR/cd
    - Genus: Hyaena
      - Striped hyena, Hyaena hyaena LR/nt
    - Genus: Proteles
      - Aardwolf, Proteles cristatus LR/lc
- Suborder: Caniformia
  - Family: Canidae (dogs, foxes)
    - Genus: Vulpes
      - Pale fox, Vulpes pallida DD
    - Genus: Canis
      - African golden wolf, Canis lupaster LC
      - Black-backed jackal, Canis mesomelas LC
    - Genus: Lycaon
    - Genus: Lycaon
      - African wild dog, L. pictus EN extirpated
  - Family: Mustelidae (mustelids)
    - Genus: Ictonyx
      - Striped polecat, Ictonyx striatus LR/lc
    - Genus: Mellivora
      - Honey badger, Mellivora capensis LC
    - Genus: Hydrictis
      - Speckle-throated otter, Hydrictis maculicollis LC
    - Genus: Aonyx
      - African clawless otter, Aonyx capensis LC

== Order: Perissodactyla (odd-toed ungulates) ==
The odd-toed ungulates are browsing and grazing mammals. They are usually large to very large, and have relatively simple stomachs and a large middle toe.

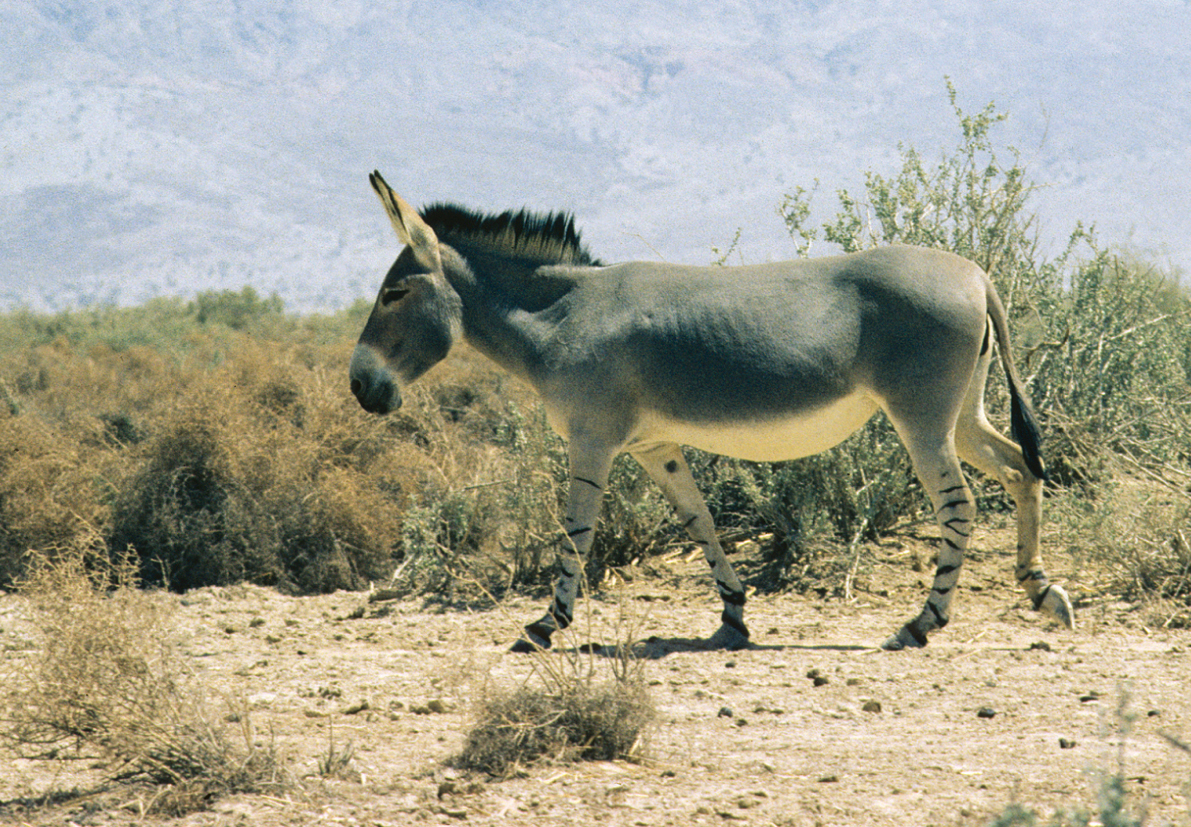
African wild ass

- Family: Equidae (horses etc.)
  - Genus: Equus
    - African wild ass, E. africanus CR
      - Somali wild ass, E. a. somaliensis CR

== Order: Artiodactyla (even-toed ungulates) ==
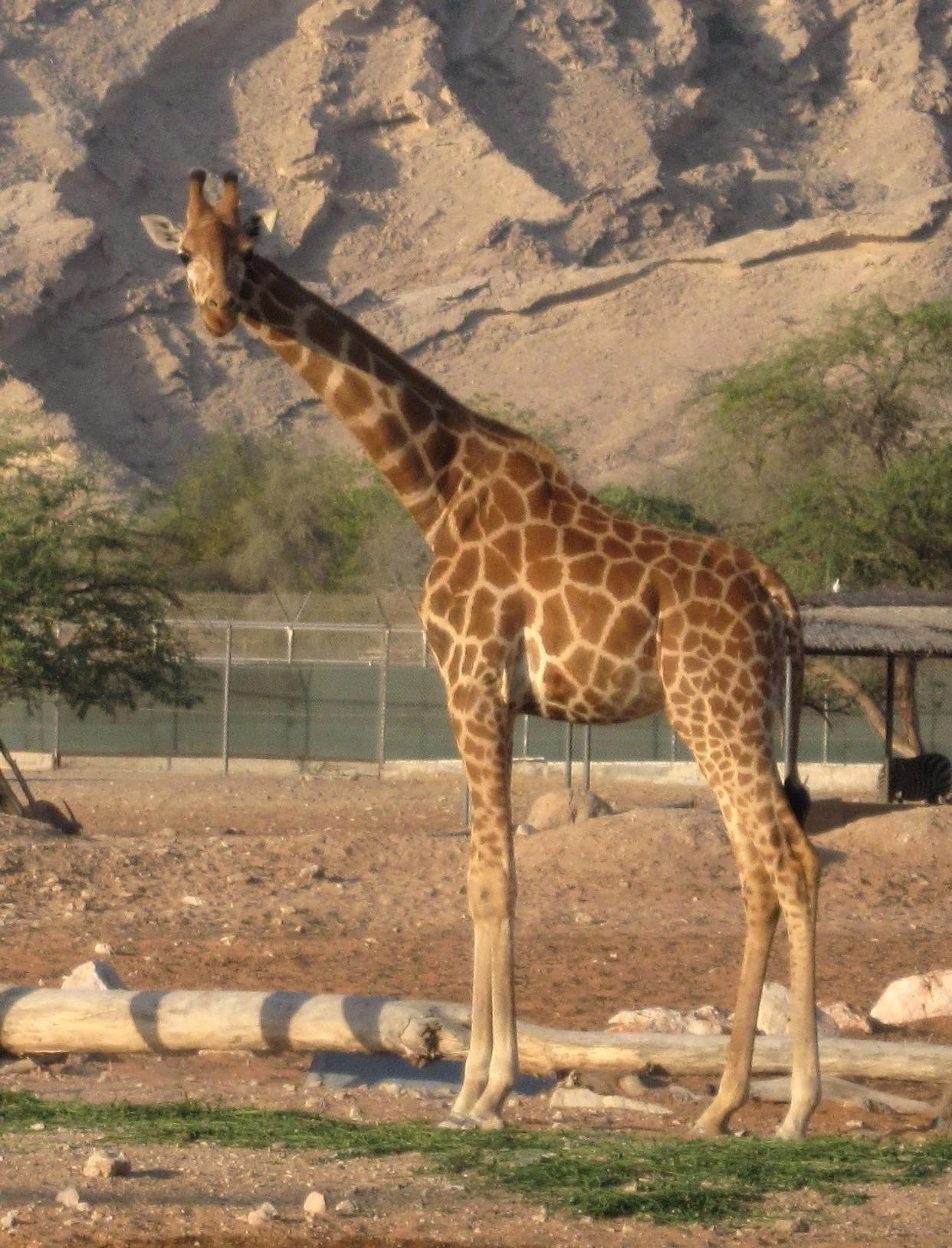
Nubian giraffe

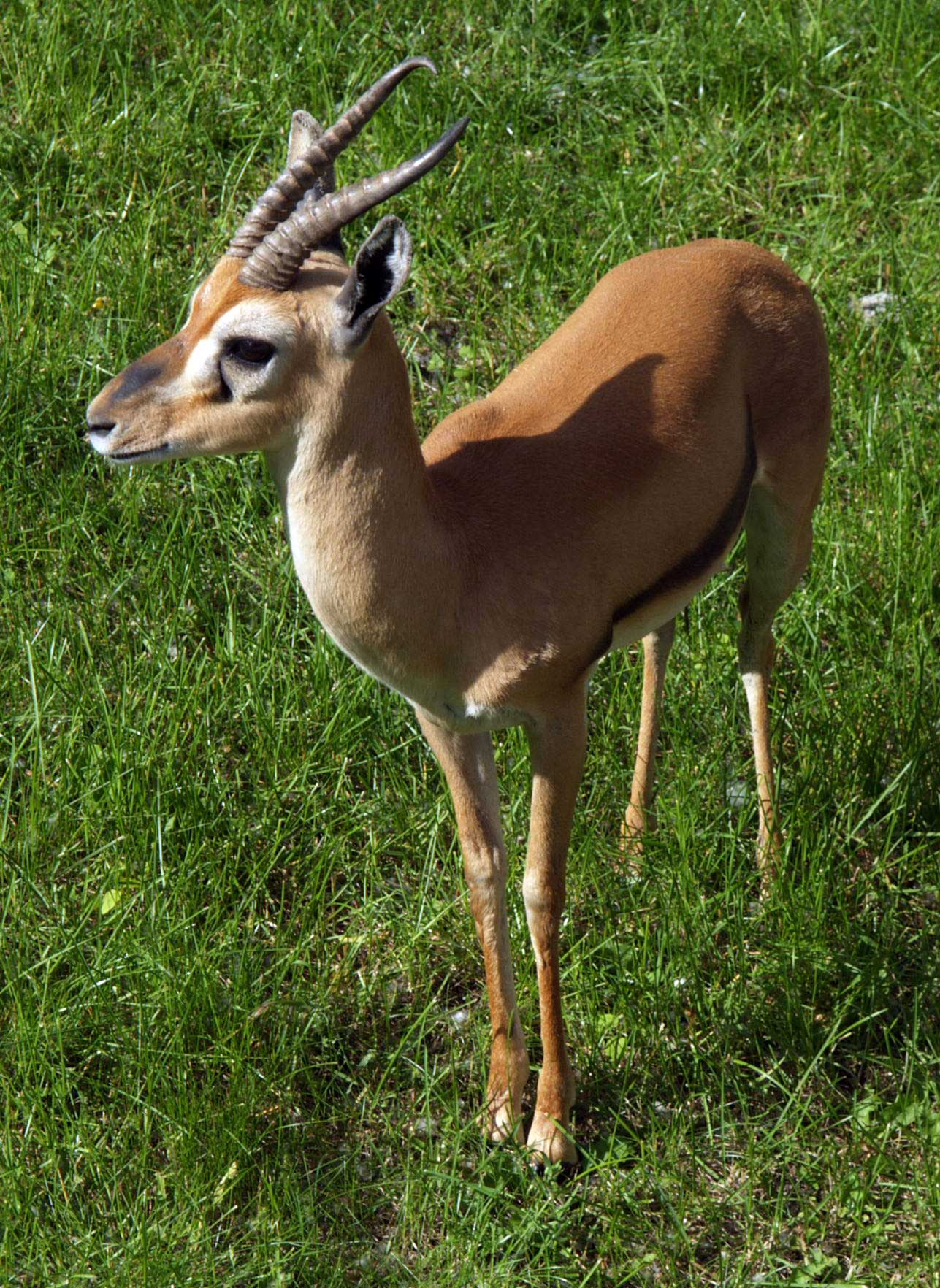
Red-fronted gazelle

The even-toed ungulates are ungulates whose weight is borne about equally by the third and fourth toes, rather than mostly or entirely by the third as in perissodactyls. There are about 220 artiodactyl species, including many that are of great economic importance to humans.

- Family: Suidae (pigs)
  - Subfamily: Phacochoerinae
    - Genus: Phacochoerus
      - Desert warthog, Phacochoerus aethiopicus LR/lc
      - Common warthog, Phacochoerus africanus LR/lc
- Family: Giraffidae (giraffe, okapi)
  - Genus: Giraffa
    - Giraffe, Giraffa camelopardalis VU extirpated
- Family: Bovidae (cattle, antelope, sheep, goats)
  - Subfamily: Alcelaphinae
    - Genus: Alcelaphus
      - Hartebeest, Alcelaphus buselaphus LC possibly extirpated
  - Subfamily: Antilopinae
    - Genus: Gazella
      - Dorcas gazelle, Gazella dorcas VU
      - Red-fronted gazelle, Gazella rufifrons VU
      - Soemmerring's gazelle, Gazella soemmerringii VU
    - Genus: Madoqua
      - Salt's dik-dik, Madoqua saltiana LR/lc
    - Genus: Oreotragus
      - Klipspringer, Oreotragus oreotragus LR/cd
    - Genus: Ourebia
      - Oribi, Ourebia ourebi LR/cd
  - Subfamily: Bovinae
    - Genus: Syncerus
      - African buffalo, S. caffer NT extirpated
    - Genus: Tragelaphus
      - Greater kudu, Tragelaphus strepsiceros LR/cd
  - Subfamily: Hippotraginae
    - Genus: Hippotragus
      - Roan antelope, H. equinus LC extirpated
    - Genus: Oryx
      - East African oryx, Oryx beisa EN possibly extirpated
- Family: Hippopotamidae (hippopotamuses)
  - Genus: Hippopotamus
    - Hippopotamus, Hippopotamus amphibius VU extirpated

== See also ==
- List of chordate orders
- Lists of mammals by region
- List of prehistoric mammals
- Mammal classification
- List of mammals described in the 2000s
