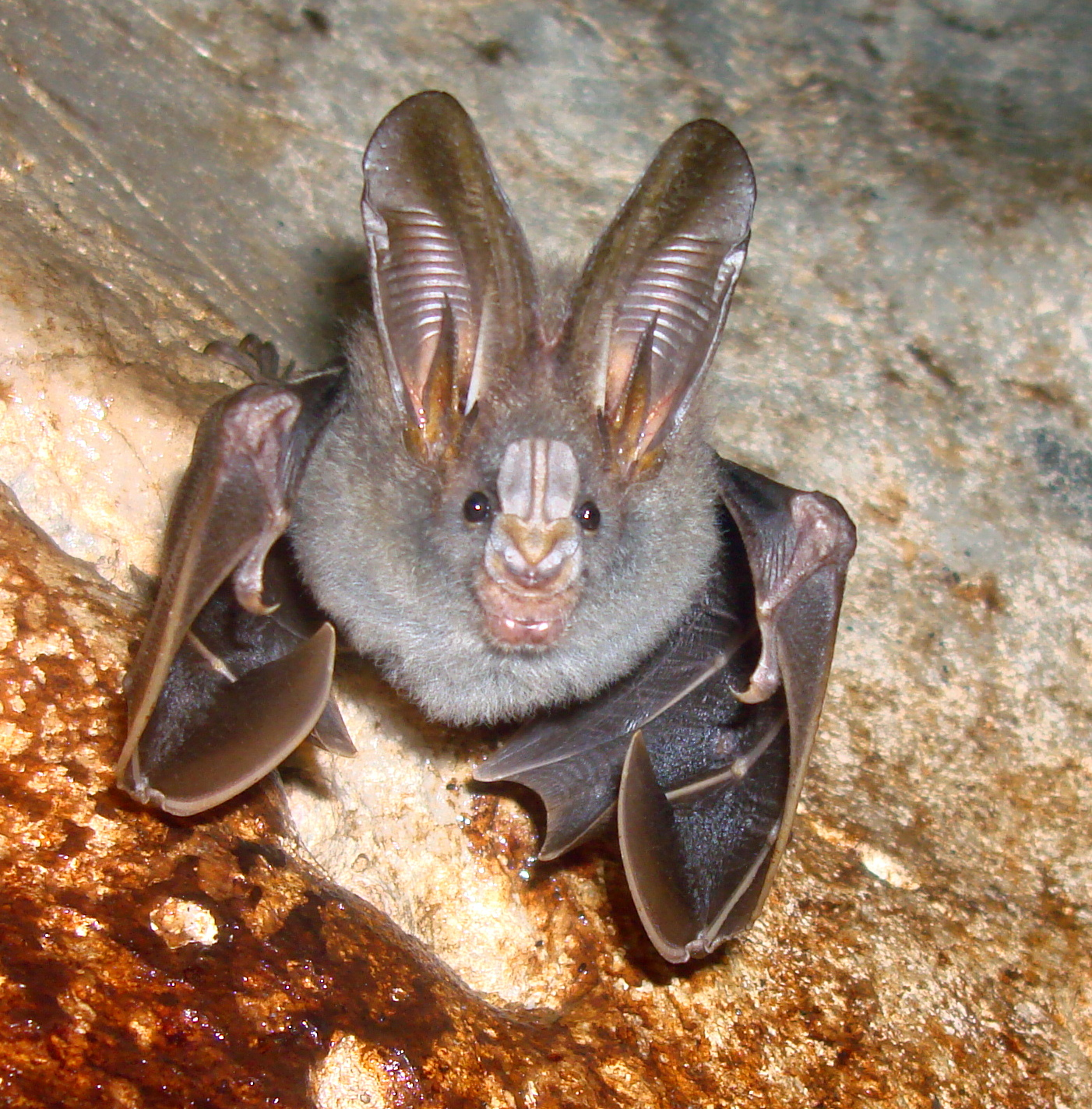

Conservation status
- Least Concern (IUCN 3.1)

Scientific classification
- Kingdom: Animalia
- Phylum: Chordata
- Class: Mammalia
- Order: Chiroptera
- Family: Megadermatidae
- Genus: Megaderma
- Species: M. spasma

Binomial name
- Megaderma spasma (Linnaeus, 1758)
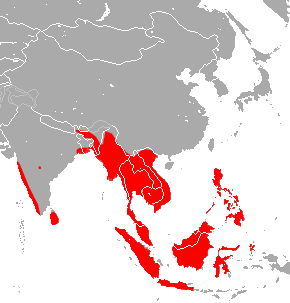
- Lesser false vampire bat range

Synonyms
- Vespertilio spasma Linnaeus, 1758

= Lesser false vampire bat =

Species of bat

The lesser false vampire bat (Megaderma spasma) is a bat found in South Asia and Southeast Asia from Sri Lanka and India in the west to Indonesia and the Philippines in the east. They live in caves and tree hollows. They are insectivorous.

== Description ==
The lesser false vampire bat has a wingspan of up to 30 centimetres (12 in) and have a head-and-body length of around 10 centimetres (3.9 in). Their forearms are normally around 7 centimetres (2.8 in).

The lesser false vampire bat has yellowish veins through the wing, and when the wings are spread with light behind, they are given a prominent yellow/orange tinge. Their body colour ranges from grey-brown to blue-brown. Lesser false vampire bats live in rock crevices, caves, foliage and hollow trees, depending on availability, as well as hanging and sleeping on trees in general.

M. spasma has fur pale grey to grey-brown in colour. Its noseleaf has long dorsal lobe with stiffened central ridge and broad convex flaps on the sides. Its ears are very large, joined at the base and it has no visible tail. Its echolocation pulses are short, low in density and broadband and its large ears are sensitive to echoes returning from their pulses and also sensitive to the sounds that prey generates. M. spasma usually roosts in groups in caves, pits, building, and hollow trees. M. spasma favours grasshoppers and moths but sometimes they eat small vertebrates, including other bats. They have well-developed, forward-pointing eyes and can locate prey visually.

== Taxonomy and range ==
Megaderma spasma is classified in the order Chiroptera, family Megadermatidae, which comprises four genera and five species. It is most closely related to the greater false vampire bat, the only other species in the genus Megaderma. The type locality for the species was in Indonesia, the Maluku Islands, and at Ternate. There are two specimens of M. spasma collected and kept at Sarawak Museum Unimas, one from Niah and the other from Batu 16, Ulu Gombak.

== Distribution ==
M. spasma is distributed throughout the southern and eastern Indian Subcontinent, including India, Bangladesh, Bhutan, Sri Lanka, and the Andaman and Nicobar Islands. It is also present in mainland Southeast Asia, the Malay Peninsula, the Philippines, and much of Indonesia.

== Ecology and behavior ==
M. spasma usually roosts in a group of 3–30 individuals. Their ecological importance may be both positive and negative to humans. They eat some insects which harm human crops, but they may carry and transmit certain diseases.
