= Thongaree's disc-nosed bat =

Conservation status
- Critically Endangered (IUCN 3.1)

Scientific classification
- Kingdom: Animalia
- Phylum: Chordata
- Class: Mammalia
- Order: Chiroptera
- Family: Megadermatidae
- Genus: Eudiscoderma; Soisook, Prajakjitr, Karapan, Francis & Bates, 2015
- Species: E. thongareeae

Binomial name
- Eudiscoderma thongareeae Soisook, Prajakjitr, Karapan, Francis & Bates, 2015
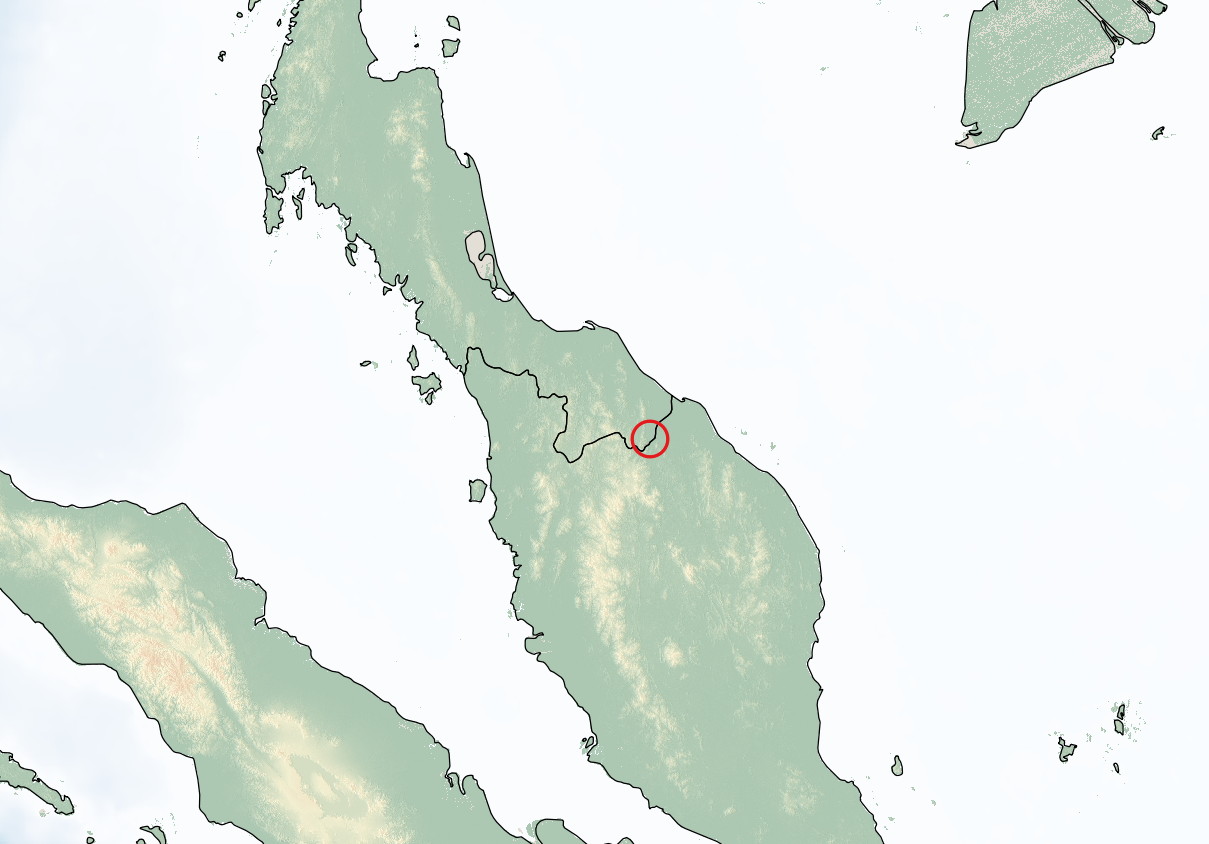

Species of bat

Thongaree's disc-nosed bat (Eudiscoderma thongareeae) is a critically endangered species of bat found in Thailand. It is the only member of the genus Eudiscoderma.

It has been observed eating beetles. All known individuals of its species have come from Thailand in the Bala Forest of Narathiwat Province.

This species is currently evaluated as critically endangered by the IUCN. The known area of occupancy of this species is 0.03–1 km^{2} (0.012–0.39 mi^{2}). Only three individuals have ever been observed.
