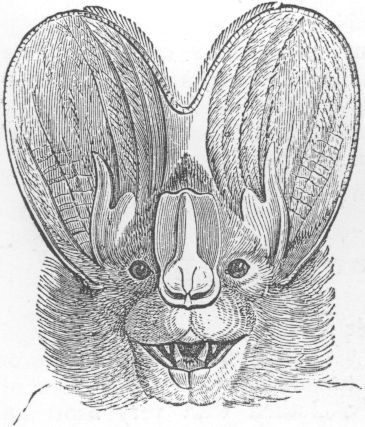
- Greater false vampire bat (Megaderma lyra)

Scientific classification
- Domain: Eukaryota
- Kingdom: Animalia
- Phylum: Chordata
- Class: Mammalia
- Order: Chiroptera
- Family: Megadermatidae
- Genus: Megaderma (E. Geoffroy, 1810)

Type species
- Vespertilio spasma Linnaeus, 1758

Species
- 2 recognized species.

= Megaderma =

Genus of bats

Megaderma is a genus of bat in the family Megadermatidae. It contains two living species:

- Lesser false vampire bat (Megaderma spasma)
- Greater false vampire bat (Megaderma lyra)

Megaderma lyra has a larger wingspan than Megaderma spasma. Members of this genus are found in Southeast Asia, India and Sri Lanka. The ranges of the two species overlap in the Malayan Peninsula, Sri Lanka, Thailand, Vietnam, Cambodia, Myanmar and along the east coast of India.

The ghost bat (Macroderma gigas) was included in Megaderma before reclassification in Macroderma.
