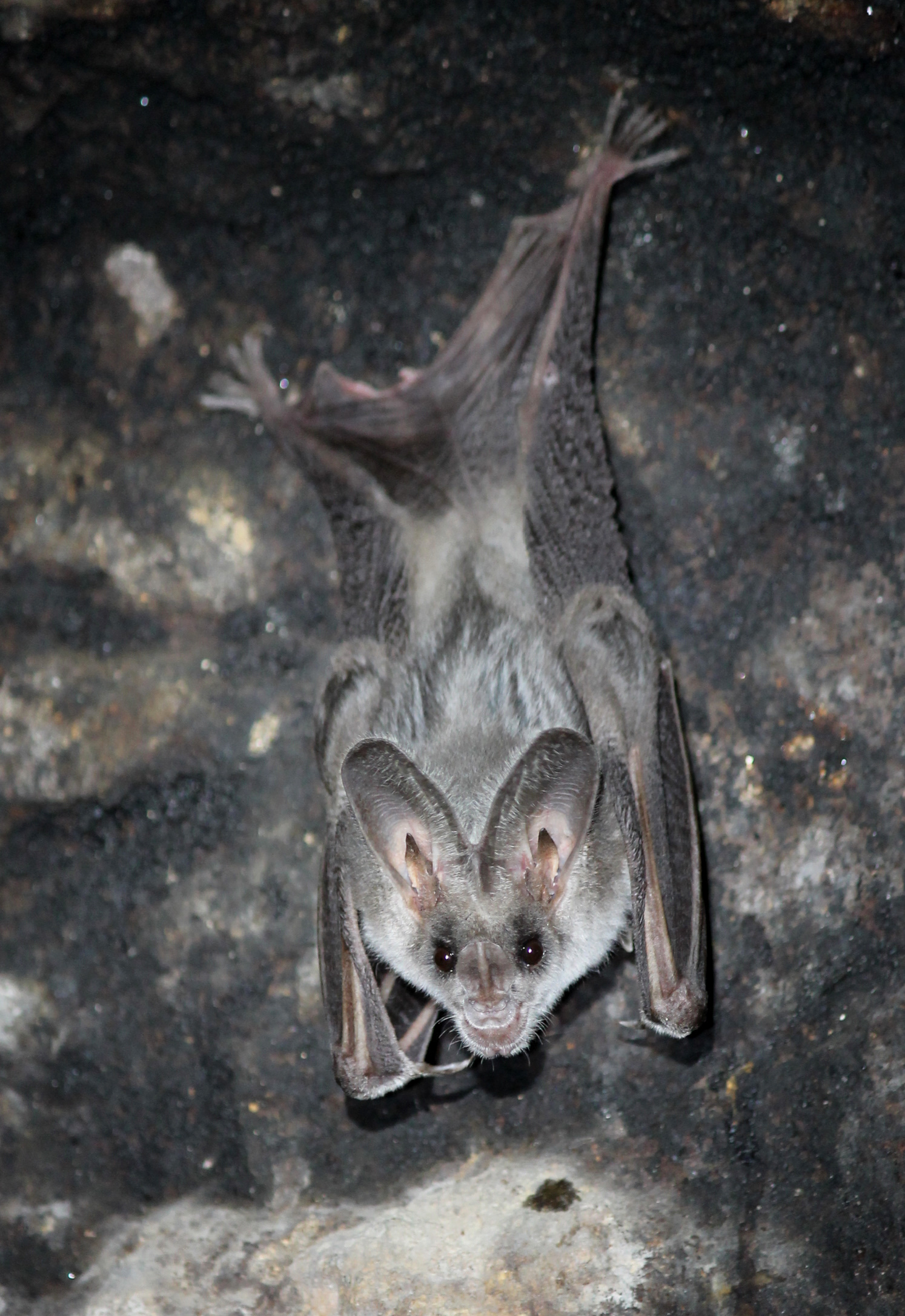

Conservation status
- Least Concern (IUCN 3.1)

Scientific classification
- Kingdom: Animalia
- Phylum: Chordata
- Class: Mammalia
- Order: Chiroptera
- Family: Megadermatidae
- Genus: Megaderma
- Species: M. lyra

Binomial name
- Megaderma lyra E. Geoffroy, 1810
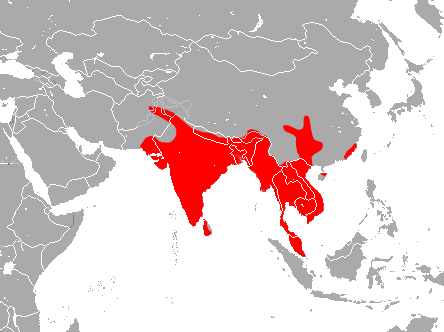
- Greater false vampire bat range

Synonyms
- Lyroderma lyra

= Greater false vampire bat =

Species of bat

The greater false vampire bat (Megaderma lyra) is a species of bat in the family Megadermatidae, the false vampire bats. It is native to Asia. It is also known as the Indian false vampire bat or greater false-vampire

== Description ==
This species is 6.5–9.5 cm (2.6–3.7 in) in length and weighs 40 to 60 g (1.4 to 2.1 oz). The average forearm length is about 6.5–7.2 cm (2.6–2.8 in). It has large ears and no tail. Its fur is blue-gray in color overall and brownish gray on the underside. It has an erect noseleaf about 10 millimeters long.

== Distribution ==
This bat is widespread throughout South Asia and Southeast Asia. It occurs in Afghanistan, Bangladesh, Burma, Cambodia, China, India, Laos, Malaysia, Nepal, Pakistan, Sri Lanka, Thailand, and Vietnam.

== Biology ==
This species is highly carnivorous; its diet includes other bats, small birds, reptiles, fish, and large insects. It is a gleaning bat, one which captures prey from the ground and from water surfaces. It takes advantage of many habitat types. Adults hunt from dusk to dawn, commuting up to 4 kilometers.

L. lyra uses a combination of hunting strategies. About 85% of prey is captured during short searching flights in which it flies about half a meter above the ground. It also utilizes a sit-and-wait strategy, perching about two meters above the ground to wait for prey. It uses echolocation. It is capable of hunting using both vision and passively listening for its prey, and has also been observed catching prey in complete darkness without echolocation.

Females segregate themselves from males after mating. Gestation lasts 150 to 160 days, and the female bears one or two pups. Females carry small pups with them during foraging, but leave larger pups in the roost. Young nurse for 2 to 3 months.

== Predation ==
Predation of this bat likely occurs on young in roosts by small predators such as snakes, viverrids, and birds of prey.
