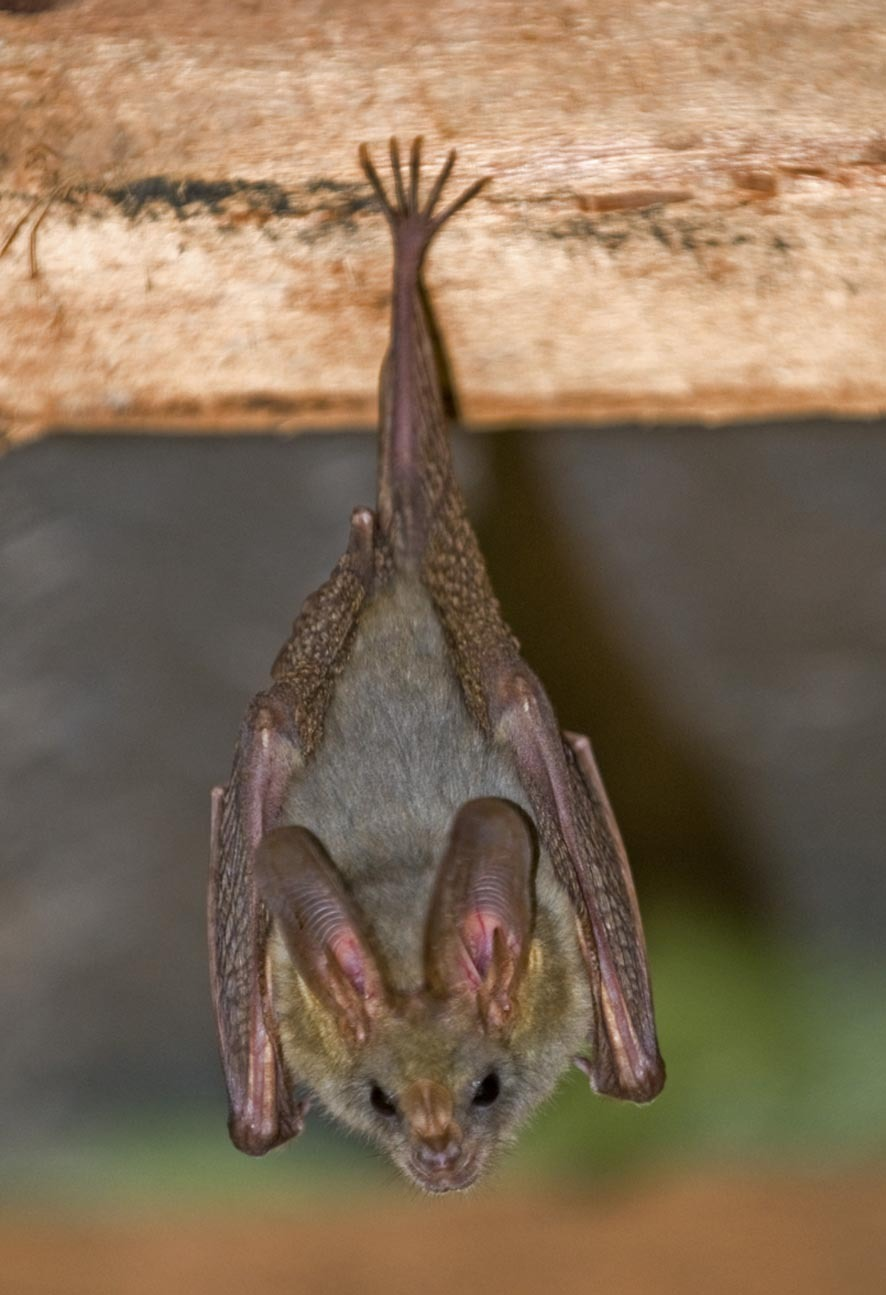

Conservation status
- Least Concern (IUCN 3.1)

Scientific classification
- Kingdom: Animalia
- Phylum: Chordata
- Class: Mammalia
- Order: Chiroptera
- Family: Megadermatidae
- Genus: Cardioderma; Peters, 1873
- Species: C. cor

Binomial name
- Cardioderma cor Peters, 1872
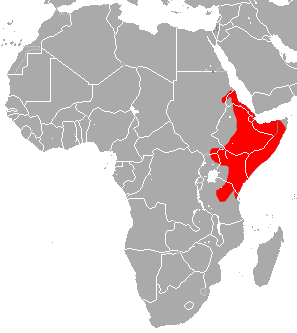
- Heart-nosed bat range

= Heart-nosed bat =

Species of Old World false vampire bat

The heart-nosed bat (Cardioderma cor) is a species of bat in the family Megadermatidae. It is the only species within the genus Cardioderma. It is found in eastern Sudan, north Tanzania, and south Zambia. In an experiment conducted in 2017, it was concluded that heart-nosed bats emit vocalizations or "sing" as a way to establish their foraging areas and actively defend these territories from other bats of the same species.

== Habitat ==
The heart-nosed bat typically occupies areas that are in dry lowlands, coastal strips, and river valleys. Places of interest that the bats tend to gather in the daylight hours are abandoned buildings, dry caves, or baobab trees. They are also found living no higher than 940 meters or 3,094 feet in elevation. Heart-nosed bats live in large colonies together, but they are very territorial and do not mingle with other bat species.

== Appearance ==
Heart-nosed bats weigh 21–35 g (0.74–1.23 oz) and are 70–77 mm (2.8–3.0 in) in length. Heart-nosed bats have blueish/grayish fur. Their fur also hangs off of their body and is considered to be long and loose. These bats have no tails, unlike most other species of bats. Some of the most recognizable features of this species is its teeth and skull, as well as its heart-shaped nose.

== Reproduction ==
Heart-nosed bats are monogamous. If possible, mates will stay together during multiple mating seasons. Breeding sites are extremely territorial and are typically protected by the males. These sites are set up during the breeding season itself and afterwards it will be taken down. A new breeding site will be found for the next mating season. The female period of gestation is three months. Baby bats are referred to as pups. Heart-nosed bats can only have one pup at a time. Females, like all mammals, feed their young via lactation. Females will carry their newborns until two months of age. After the third month, the pup is weaned from its mother and will then follow the mother around. The pup learns from its mother about foraging and territories that will allow them to be successful later in their life. The father's parental behavior is mostly unknown, but it is thought that the songs and territorial protection is protection of the mother and their young. The prime reproduction months happen between March and June and then again between October and December. These months are in the rainy season months and make the best mating months for heart-nosed bats.

== Behavior and diet ==
Heart-nosed bats are nocturnal. Depending on when the sun sets, they will wake up and start making their way to their feeding zones. They will typically do this a couple minutes before the sun actually sets. These bats have a strategy called "hawking" that allows them to collect bugs. They also use a "sit-and-wait" strategy. The sit-and-wait strategy involves hanging from a perch and waiting until an insect comes along to be preyed upon. The sit-and-wait strategy is usually used during the dry season. Hawking is usually used when the wet seasons are happening. During the dry season, the heart-nosed bats diet primarily consists of terrestrial beetles and leaf gleaning. The most common beetles that are fed on are the Scarabaeidae, Tenebrionidae, and the Carabidae. During the wet season, the heart-nosed bat's diet primarily consists of large terrestrial beetles, locusts, katydids, moths, small bats, and frogs. These bats mainly stick to themselves and do not mingle with other species. The cause of this is unknown. There are no known predators that actively seek out heart-nosed bats. However, common predators such as snakes, cats, and owls will prey on the young pups if the opportunity arises. Heart-nosed bats also take time out of the day to groom themselves and others. It is unknown if this helps increase the social bond between the bats as it would in other species.

== Ecosystem ==
Heart-nosed bats are extremely beneficial for the ecosystem and environment. They primarily feed on bugs, which allows for insect and pest regulations. Crops that could be easily damaged by pests will be taken care of by the bats. Insect populations that are growing too quickly will also be taken care of. While they are mostly beneficial, there is one negative aspect to the heart-nosed bats in the ecosystem. The heart-nosed bat is a carrier of Borrelia. Borrelia is a bacterium that can cause Lyme disease. This can be transferred to humans, and be given a fever along with the illness.

== Vocalization ==
Heart-nosed bats are one of the first bat species to be heard singing, or vocalizing. Many behaviors of this bat are still unknown but it was found with studies that the heart-nosed bats will cluster together in the daylight hours but then go their separate ways during the night hours. The night hours are when the singing takes place. It was observed that there are two known songs. The more common of the two songs is referred to as a loud song. The less common of the two songs is referred to as a soft song. The soft song is sung more during the dry season than the loud song. Each bat has their own variation of both songs, especially the soft song. While these songs were being observed, although each of them varied, all the songs had a similar pattern to them. It was clear which song was being sung. One theory to the heart-nosed bats singing and songs are linked to how territorial they are. Another theory is the singing corresponds to social interactions between each bat, which is why the songs themselves are unique to the individual.
