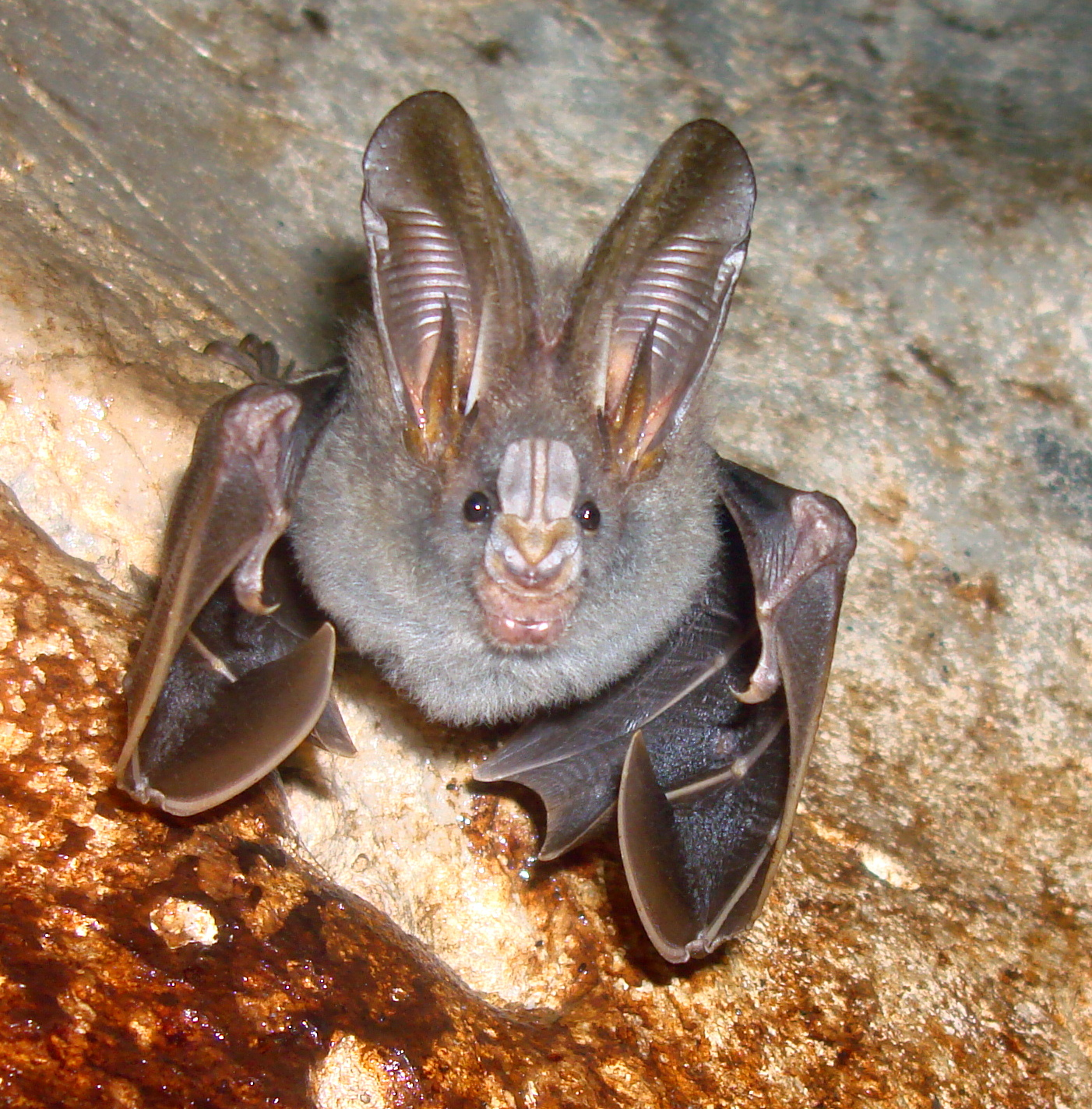
- Megaderma spasma

Scientific classification
- Kingdom: Animalia
- Phylum: Chordata
- Class: Mammalia
- Order: Chiroptera
- Superfamily: Rhinolophoidea
- Family: Megadermatidae; H. Allen, 1864

Type genus
- Megaderma Geoffroy, 1810

Genera
- Cardioderma; Lavia; Macroderma; Megaderma; Eudiscoderma †Saharaderma
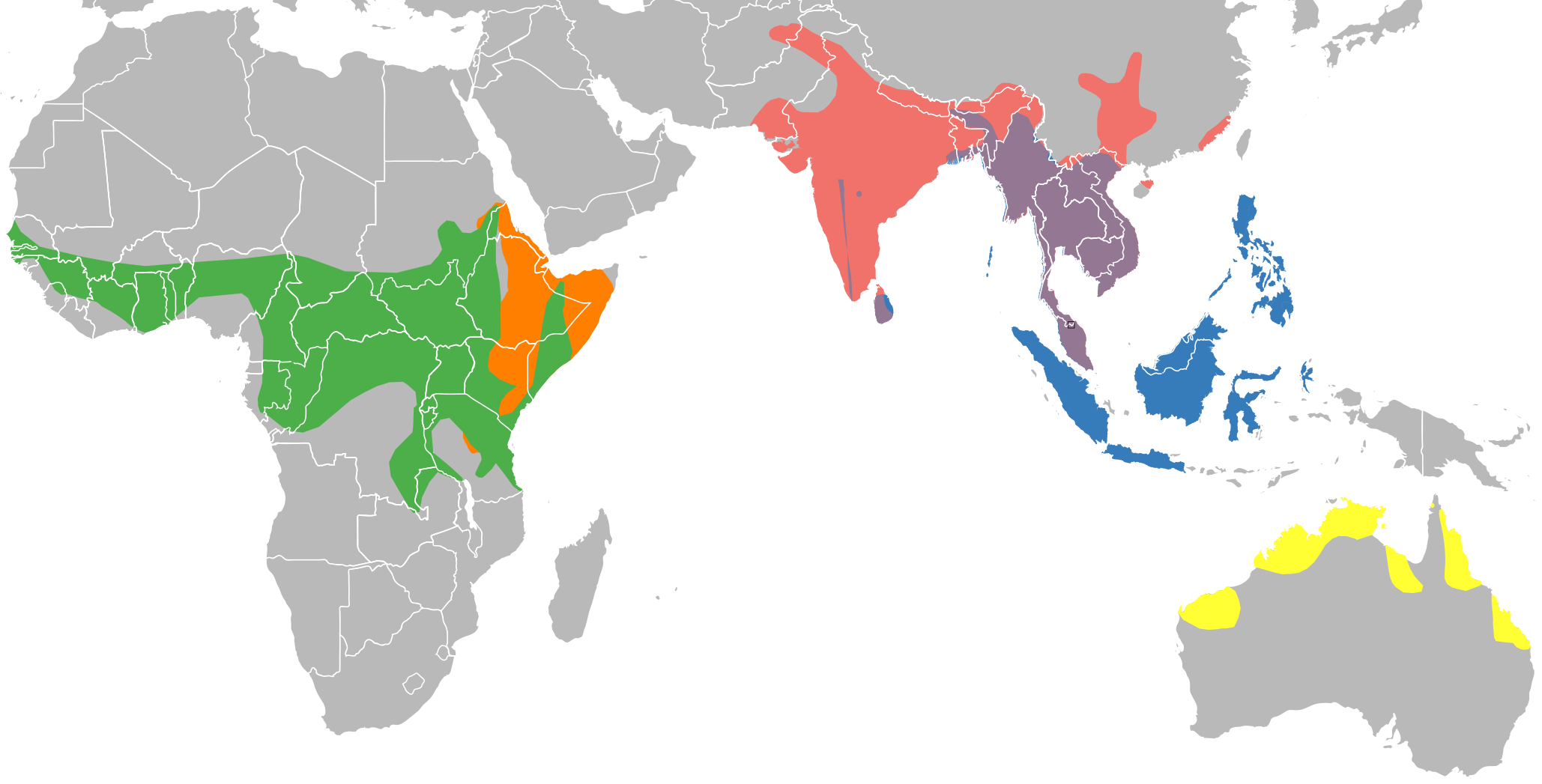
- Megadermatidae distribution Lavia frons in green, Cardioderma cor in orange (brown where ranges overlap), Megaderma lyra in red, Megaderma spasma in blue (purple where ranges overlap), Macroderma gigas in yellow, Eudiscoderma thongareeae in black box.

= Megadermatidae =

Megadermatidae Temporal range: Late Eocene to Recent, 34–0 Ma

Family of bats

Megadermatidae, or false vampire bats, are a family of bats found from central Africa, eastwards through southern Asia, and into Australia. They are relatively large bats, ranging from 6.5 cm to 14 cm in head-body length. They have large eyes, very large ears and a prominent nose-leaf. They have a wide membrane between the hind legs, or uropatagium, but no tail. Many species are a drab brown, but some are white, bluish-grey or even olive-green, helping to camouflage them against their preferred roosting environments.

They are primarily insectivorous, but will also eat a wide range of small vertebrates.

== Description ==
False vampire bats are relatively large, with combined head and body lengths that range from 65–140 mm (2.6–5.5 in) - the ghost bat is the largest member of the family. Their forearm lengths range from 50–115 mm (2.0–4.5 in). All species lack tails and have very large ears with divided tragi. They have long nose-leaves. All species lack upper incisors, though not all have the same dental formulae. The lesser false vampire bat and greater false vampire bat have a dental formula of 0.1.2.32.1.2.3 × 2 = 28, while the ghost bat, heart-nosed bat, Thongaree's disc-nosed bat, and yellow-winged bat have a dental formula of 0.1.1.32.1.2.3 × 2 = 26.

== Biology and ecology ==
These species are collectively called false vampire due to the old misconception that they were sanguivorous like the true vampire bats. The ghost bat, heart-nosed bat, lesser false vampire bat, and greater false vampire bat feed on insects and small vertebrates; the yellow-winged bat and Thongaree's disc-nosed bat are likely fully insectivorous. The heart-nosed bat, greater false vampire bat, and the ghost bat are three of the few bat-eating bats in the world. While the yellow-winged bat is sometimes active in daylight, all other species of this family are nocturnal.

== Systematics ==
- Rhinolophoidea
  - Megadermatidae (false vampire bats)
  - - - Craseonycteridae (Kitti's hog-nosed bat)
      - Rhinopomatidae (mouse-tailed bats)
    - - Hipposideridae (Old World leaf-nosed bats)
      - Rhinolophidae (horseshoe bats)

Internal relationships of the Rhinolophoidea, according to a 2011 study

- Megadermatidae
  - Megaderma spasma (lesser false vampire bat)
  - - - Lyroderma lyra (greater false vampire bat)
      - Lavia frons (yellow-winged bat)
    - - Cardioderma cor (heart-nosed bat)
      - Macroderma gigas (ghost bat)

Internal relationships of the Megadermatidae, according to a 2015 study

Megadermatidae is a family within the Rhinolophoidea superfamily. Genetic analysis shows that it is the most basal member of the superfamily. It is a monophyletic family of bats, based on genetic analysis.

There is confusion about the relationship of species within Megadermatidae. A 2015 study concluded that, while they did not have enough genetic data to fully resolve these relationships, the two Megaderma species should be in separate genera. The authors of this paper suggested that the greater false vampire bat, Megaderma lyra, should be renamed as Lyroderma lyra.

The recovered cladogram in the 2015 study had relatively low posterior probabilities, however, underscoring the need for future study to achieve higher resolution. Note that Thongaree's disc-nosed bat, Eudiscoderma thongareeae, was not included in this analysis, as it was not described as a new species until 2015.

== Fossil record ==
Megadermatidae is a relatively old family, appearing in the fossil record as early as 37 million years ago. The earliest known member is Saharaderma Gunnel, Simons & Seiffert, 2008 from the latest Eocene of Egypt. In addition, several fossil species in extant genera have been described, including:

- Macroderma koppa Hand, Dawson & Augee, 1988 a fossil species that existed in the Pliocene epoch.
- Macroderma godthelpi Hand, 1985 the earliest and smallest species
- Macroderma malugara Hand, 1996
- Megaderma brailloni: Discovered in France; dated from the early Eocene.
- Megaderma gaillardi: Discovered in France; dated from the mid-Miocene.
- Megaderma lugdunensis: Discovered in France and the Czech Republic; dated from the mid-Miocene.
- Megaderma jaegeri: Discovered in Morocco; dated from the mid-Miocene
- Megaderma vireti: Discovered in Lissieu, France; dated from the late Miocene.
- Megaderma mediterraneum: Discovered in France; dated from the late Pliocene.
- Megaderma janossyi: Discovered in Hungary; dated from the early Pliocene.
- Megaderma watwat: Discovered in Palestine; dated from the Pleistocene.

== Conservation ==
According to the IUCN, Thongaree's disc-nosed bat is critically endangered, the ghost bat is considered vulnerable, while all other Megadermatidae species are evaluated as least concern.

== Classification ==
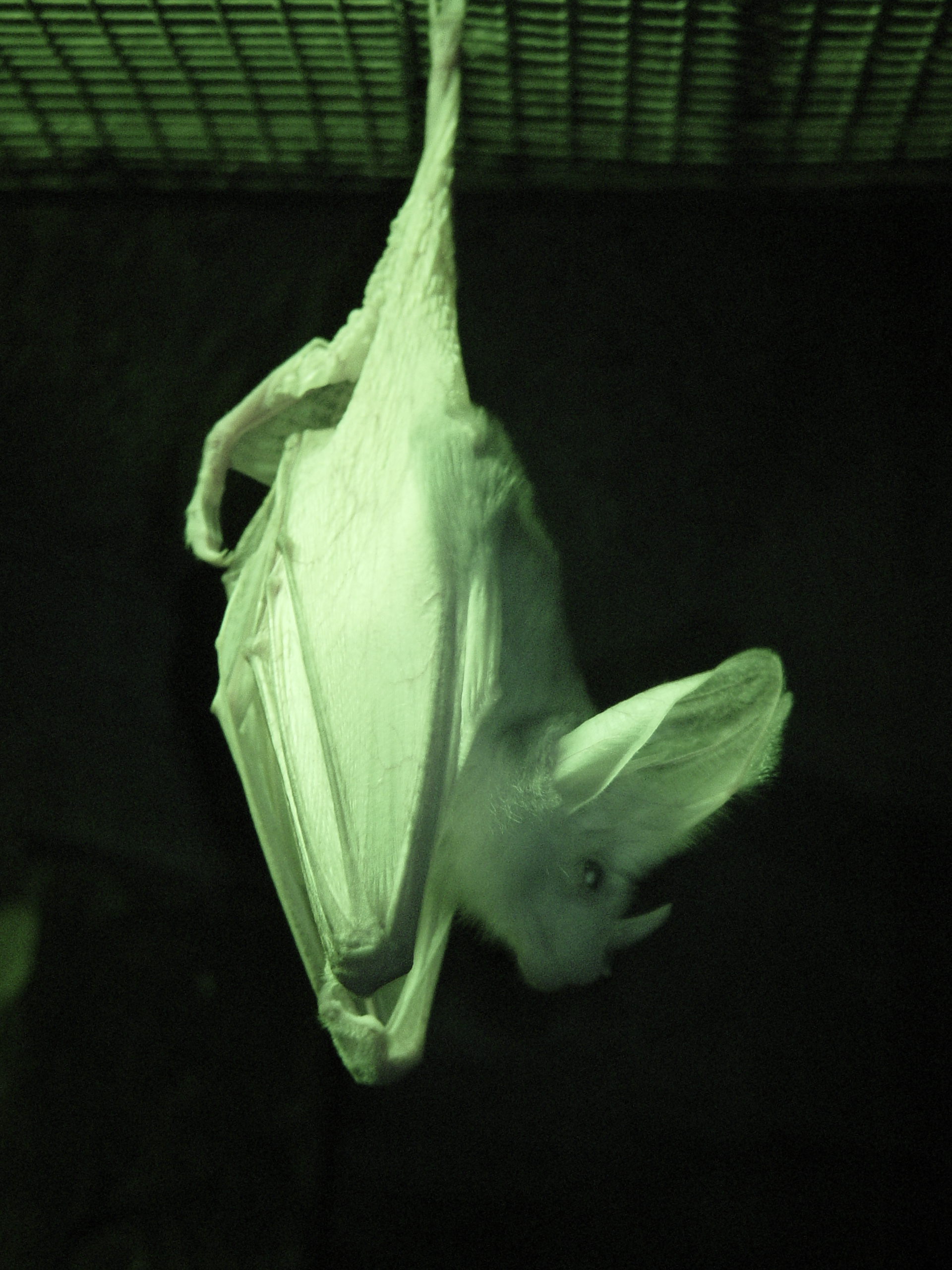
Macroderma gigas under artificial light at Perth Zoo, Australia.

A list of extant species includes,

Family Megadermatidae

- Genus Cardioderma
  - Heart-nosed bat, Cardioderma cor
- Genus Eudiscoderma
  - Thongaree's disc-nosed bat, Eudiscoderma thongareeae
- Genus Lavia
  - Yellow-winged bat, Lavia frons
- Genus Lyroderma
  - Greater false vampire bat, Lyroderma lyra
- Genus Macroderma
  - Ghost bat, Macroderma gigas
- Genus Megaderma
  - Lesser false vampire bat, Megaderma spasma
