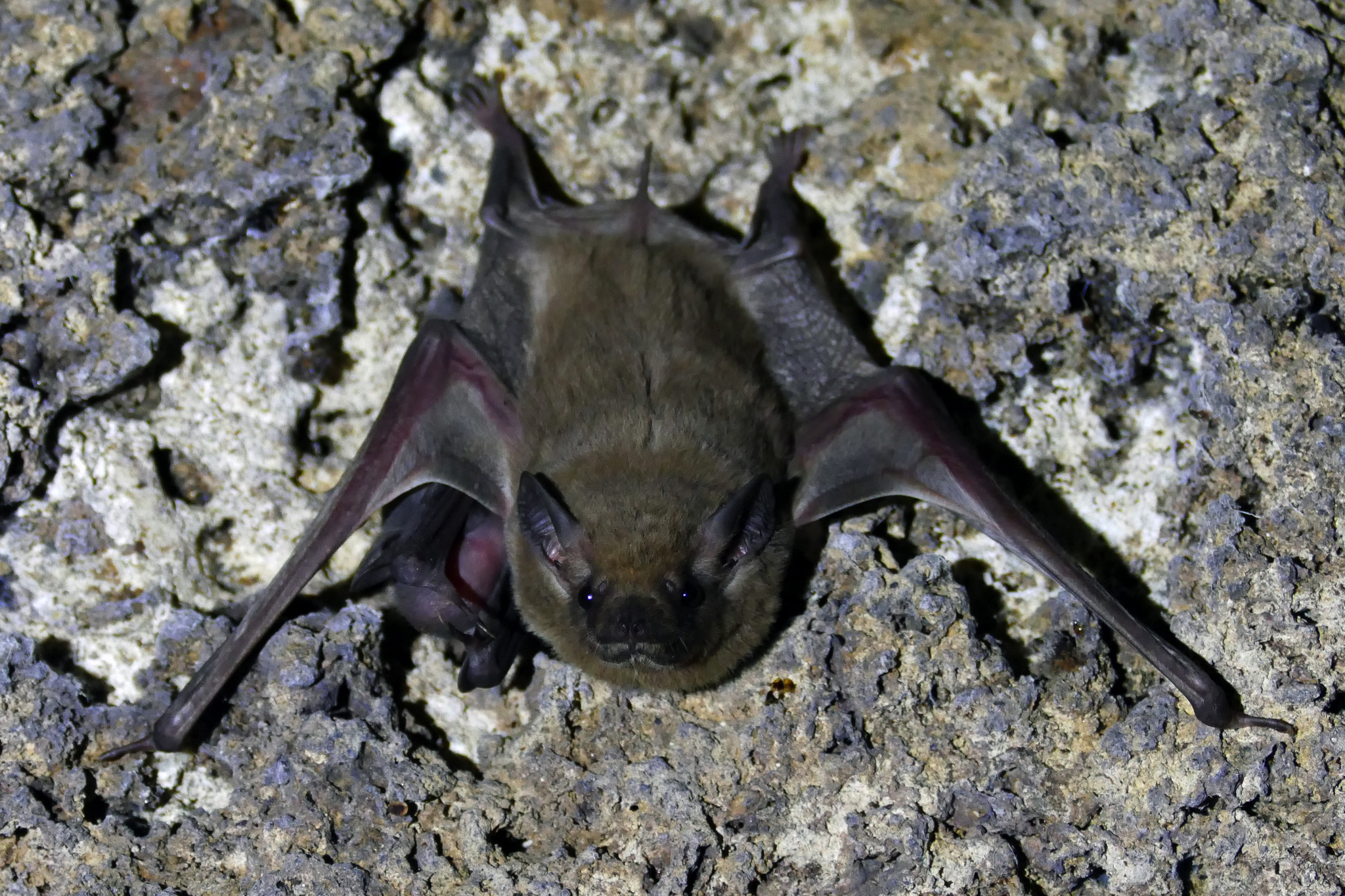
- African Sheath-tailed Bat in Kenya

Conservation status
- Least Concern (IUCN 3.1)

Scientific classification
- Kingdom: Animalia
- Phylum: Chordata
- Class: Mammalia
- Order: Chiroptera
- Family: Emballonuridae
- Genus: Coleura
- Species: C. afra

Binomial name
- Coleura afra (Peters, 1852)
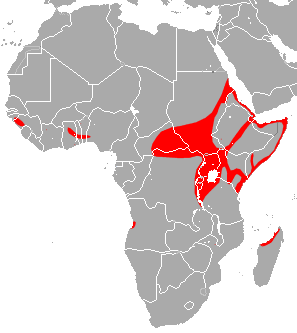
- African sheath-tailed bat range

= African sheath-tailed bat =

Species of bat

The African sheath-tailed bat (Coleura afra) is a species of sac-winged bat in the family Emballonuridae.

== Appearance and behavior ==
The African sheath-tailed bat weighs 10–12 grams (0.35–0.42 oz), with females slightly larger than males. Forearm lengths range from 45 to 55 millimetres (1.8 to 2.2 in). The fur is a deep brown, but slightly lighter on the belly. The nose is a pointed cone shape and the rhinarium is black and naked. It is insectivorous, feeding on a range of insects, but particularly beetles and lepidopterans. Feeding is strongly dependent on the season, with much greater feeding activity occurring during the rainy season. It lives in caverns in groups exceeding 50,000. Within colonies, the social structure consists of harems of around 20 females being attended usually by a single male. While female juveniles sometimes remain within the cluster into which they were born, young males disperse and join bachelor clusters.

== Distribution and habitat ==
The African sheath-tailed bat is found in Angola, Benin, the Central African Republic, the Republic of the Congo, the Democratic Republic of the Congo, Ivory Coast, Djibouti, Eritrea, Ethiopia, Ghana, Guinea, Guinea-Bissau, Kenya, Madagascar, Mozambique, Nigeria, Somalia, Sudan, Tanzania, Togo, Uganda, and Yemen. Its natural habitats are dry savanna, subsaharic shrubland, subtropical or tropical dry shrubland, caves, and hot deserts.

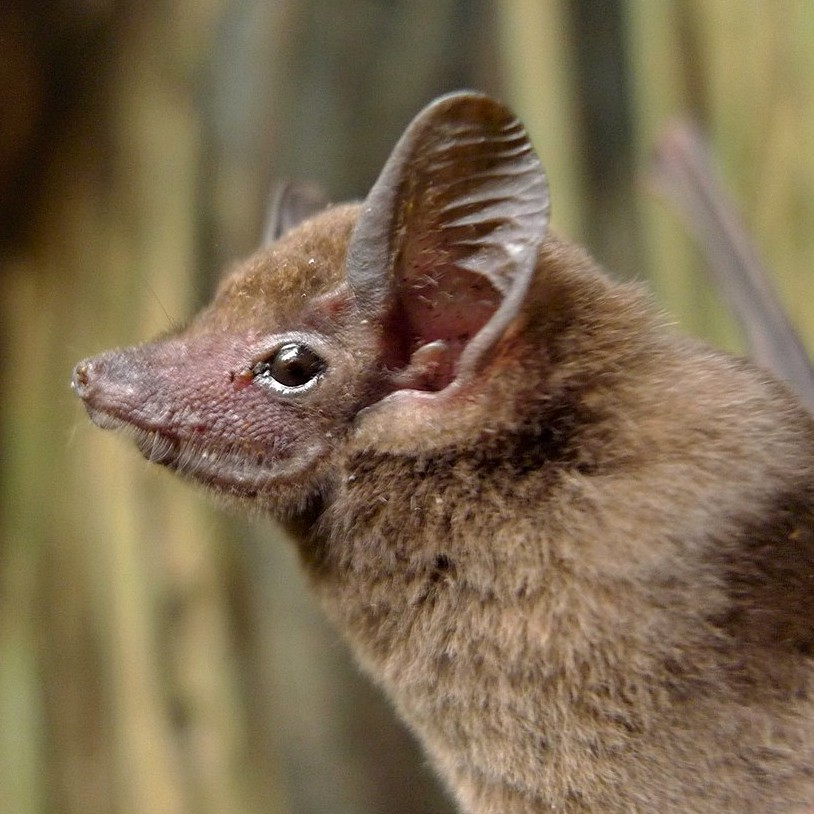
Head close-up
