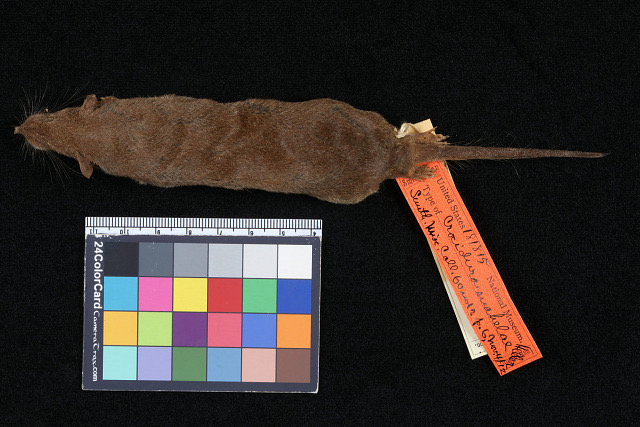
- stuffed specimen

Conservation status
- Least Concern (IUCN 3.1)

Scientific classification
- Kingdom: Animalia
- Phylum: Chordata
- Class: Mammalia
- Infraclass: Placentalia
- Order: Eulipotyphla
- Family: Soricidae
- Genus: Crocidura
- Species: C. viaria

Binomial name
- Crocidura viaria (Geoffroy, 1834)
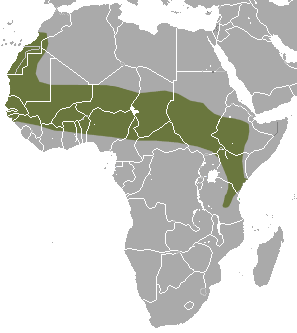
- Savanna path shrew range

= Savanna path shrew =

Species of mammal

The savanna path shrew (Crocidura viaria) is a species of mammal in the family Soricidae. It is found in Benin, Burkina Faso, Cameroon, Chad, Eritrea, Ethiopia, Ghana, Kenya, Mali, Mauritania, Morocco, Niger, Nigeria, Senegal, Somalia, Sudan, and Uganda. Its natural habitats are subtropical or tropical moist lowland forest, dry savanna, and heavily degraded former forest.
