= Macroderma koppa =

Macroderma koppa Temporal range: Pliocene

Scientific classification
- Kingdom: Animalia
- Phylum: Chordata
- Class: Mammalia
- Order: Chiroptera
- Family: Megadermatidae
- Genus: Macroderma
- Species: †M. koppa

Binomial name
- †Macroderma koppa Hand, Dawson & Augee, 1988

Fossil species of bat

Macroderma koppa is a species of bat known from fossil material found in Australia, one of the larger carnivorous megadermatid family of the order Chiroptera. They resembled the modern species Macroderma gigas, known as a false vampire or ghost bat, and also preyed on vertebrates such as small mammals, reptiles and bird, and amphibian species, whose butchered remains were found beneath their feeding roosts.

== Taxonomy ==
Macroderma koppa was described from fossil material discovered at the Wellington Caves in New South Wales. The type locality, described as Big Sink, is one of several sites containing fossil depositions in the cave system, a complex assemblage that contains a variety of vertebrate species. The author's specimens were designated as a holotype, a skull with complete dentition, and paratype material exhibiting other distinguishable characters.

The specific epithet was nominated by the authors in reference to Koppa, described by indigenous informants as a mythological spirit that is associated with the caves.

== Description ==
A megadermatid species, allied to the genus Macroderma. Macroderma koppa is regarded as a sister species to the extant Macroderma gigas, known as the false vampire of ghost bat, a predatory carnivore found in the north of Australia. The discovery at Big Sink was initially reported in 1987 as the modern species, but subsequent analysis by the palaeo-mammalogist Suzanne Hand identified morphological characteristics indicating a species that had diverged as a separate lineage.

Macroderma koppa is larger than the earlier and probably ancestral species Macroderma godthelpi, and similar in size to the modern species. They are distinguished from M. gigas by characters that include a less well developed nose-shield and two infraorbital foramina, rather than one, and had larger premolars and incisors.

== Distribution ==
The species was uncovered in excavations at the Cathedral cave, stratigraphy dated to the Pliocene, in an area associated with a phosphate mine. The Big Sink site contains other fauna of this epoch, unlike the otherwise later Pleistocene fossil deposits at the Wellington Caves area. The period of deposition for the fossil material has been verified by correlation to dating of the Riversleigh sites, where other megadermatid species are recorded. The bones of Macroderma koppa are well represented at this site, with evidence of their consumption of prey, suggesting the cave was occupied by the population as a maternity colony and feeding roost.
