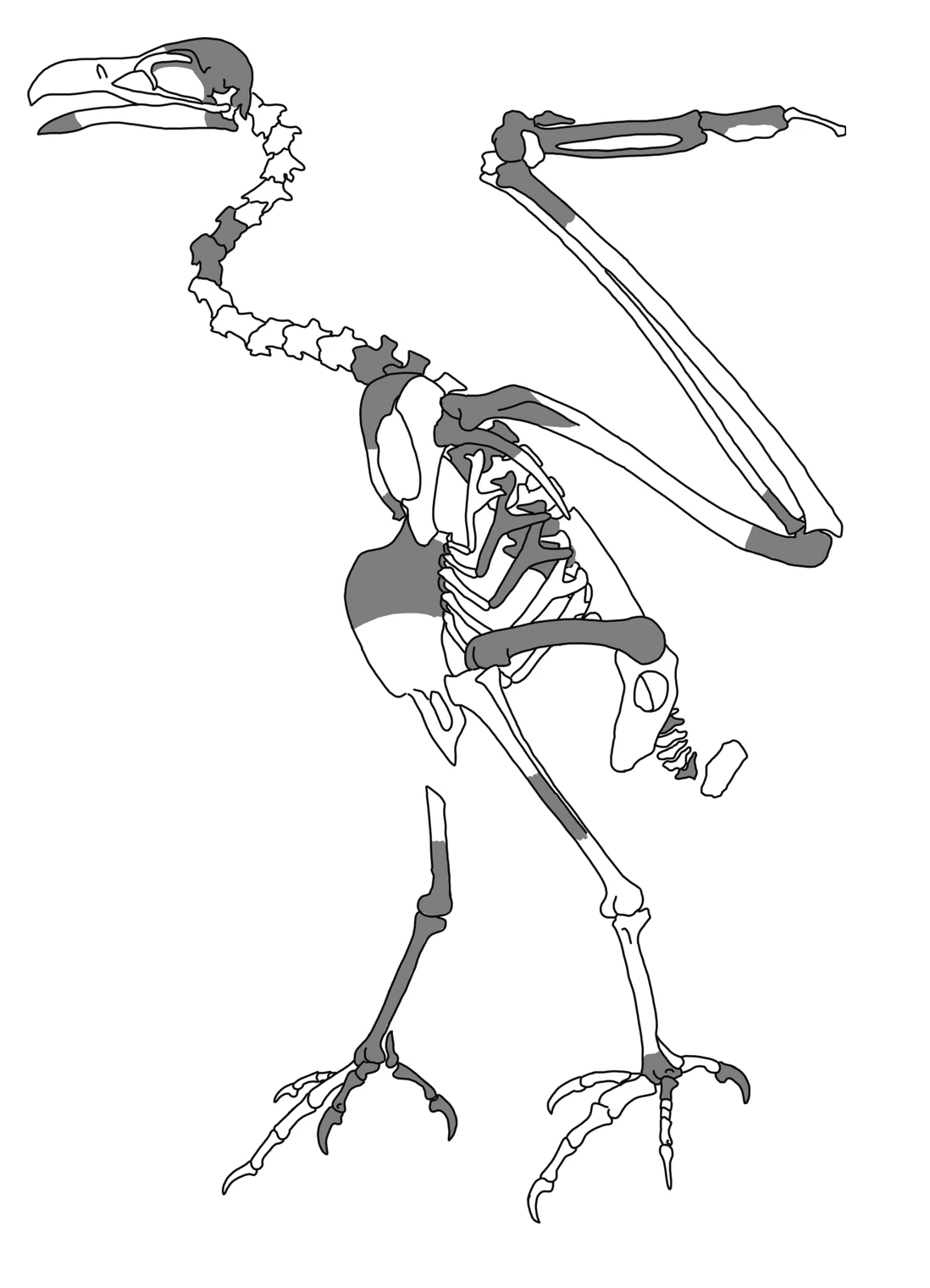
- Known skeletal elements of Dynatoaetus gaffae in grey

Scientific classification
- Domain: Eukaryota
- Kingdom: Animalia
- Phylum: Chordata
- Class: Aves
- Order: Accipitriformes
- Family: Accipitridae
- Genus: †Dynatoaetus; Mather et al., 2023

Type species
- †Dynatoaetus gaffae Mather et al., 2023

Species
- D. gaffae Mather et al., 2023; D. pachyosteus Mather et al., 2023

= Dynatoaetus =

Dynatoaetus Temporal range: Pliocene – Pleistocene, 5.333–0.05 Ma

Extinct genus of birds of prey

Dynatoaetus is an extinct genus of large bird of prey from the Pleistocene of Australia. It is among the largest known raptors of the region, second only to the Haast's eagle of New Zealand, with estimates suggesting a weight of up to 12 kg (26 lb). Although most closely related to modern vultures, it shows clear adaptations towards an active predatory lifestyle in the form of robust, powerful talons. This may either hint at it retaining these ancestral features from the closely related serpent eagles or show that it convergently evolved these features as it took on a similar lifestyle. Due to their size and robust bones, it is thought that Dynatoaetus would have been capable of taking large prey items like kangaroos, giant wombats and flightless birds. There are two species within the genus, the type species Dynatoaetus gaffae and the somewhat smaller Dynatoaetus pachyosteus, both of which inhabited the same part of Australia at the same time.

== History and naming ==
The first fossil remains now identified as belonging to Dynatoaetus were discovered in 1956 and 1969 in Mairs Cave, located in the Flinders Ranges, South Australia. This material included a variety of body parts, including toes, the upper arm and a sternum. The bones, which were found around 55 m (180 ft) into the cave, were covered in a thin calcite layer showing that the bones had not been buried and instead preserved simply lying on the floor of the cave. In later years fossils of large raptors were recovered from several more fossil sites across Australia, including Cooper Creek within the Lake Eyre Basin and the Victoria Fossil Cave (both in South Australia), and the Wellington Caves in New South Wales. However it was not until the discovery of 28 additional remains from Mairs Cave, including skull bones and vertebrae, that the various remains were found to have belonged to a single species. The discovery of these remains was made by a group of recreational speleologists and palaeontologists, which entered the cave with the express purpose of finding more fossils of the bird. Many of the bones of Mairs Cave were found to have belonged to a single individual bird, which served as the holotype when the fossils were described as a distinct genus and species by Ellen K. Mather et al. in 2023. Later that same year a second species was described from the Victoria Fossil Cave on the basis of a variety of bones including a humerus, various other limb bones, a quadrate and a partial pelvis. This species, which was noted for being notably smaller than D. gaffae, was named D. pachyosteus.

The genus name Dynatoaetus derives from the Ancient Greek "dynatós", a word meaning mighty or powerful, and "āetós" for eagle.

== Species ==
- Dynatoaetus gaffae

The type species of Dynatoaetus and the larger of the two. Fossils of this species are known from multiple regions of South Australia, including the Lake Eyre Basin, as well as New South Wales. The species name was chosen to honor Priscilla Gaff, who was the first to discuss the fossil material of this animal in a 2002 thesis.

- Dynatoaetus pachyosteus

Dynatoaetus pachyosteus was described the same year as Dynatoaetus gaffae and was noted for being smaller than the type species. Remains of it are currently only known from the Victoria Fossil Cave in South Australia, where fossils of Dynatoaetus gaffae have also been found. The species name is a combination of the Greek "pachys" meaning "thick" or "large" and "osteon", meaning bone. This name reflects the robust bones of this bird.

== Description ==
The hindlimbs of Dynatoaetus were robust and much like those of modern eagles, with the femur in particular being described as extremely large and robust. The tarsometatarsus follows the same condition, being robust and large. The metatarsals however are relatively short. Although they too match the other bones in robustness, they are not much different in length from what is observed in female wedge-tailed eagles. The ungual phalanges of Dynatoaetus gaffae, the claws of the toes, are again much larger than those of modern wedge-tailed eagles. The wings are also described as being short and robust.

The fossil remains indicate that this eagle was the largest bird of prey to have inhabited Australia, over twice the weight of the extant wedge-tailed eagle. It was, however, not as large as a female Haast's eagle (Hieraaetus moorei) from the same time of New Zealand or Gigantohierax suarezi, a buteonine from Cuba. Unlike these two birds of prey, which both likely obtained their massive sizes due to insular gigantism and a lack of notable competitors, Dynatoaetus was a continental species like the Woodward's Eagle (Amplibuteo woodwardi) from North America. It is therefore believed that its size was at least in part due to its evolutionary history, given that aegypiine vultures are known to regularly obtain large sizes. For instance, Gyps melitensis from the Pleistocene of Malta as well as the Chinese vultures Aegypius jinniushanensis and Torgos sp. were all in a similar size range as Dynatoaetus gaffae. However, due to their much more derived ecology and the influence this had on their morphology, the precise size difference is difficult to determine. Dynatoaetus gaffae may have reached a wingspan of up to 3 m (9.8 ft) while Dynatoaetus pachyosteus was likely comparable in wingspan to the wedge-tailed eagle.

Weight estimates were included in the description of the smaller species, Dynatoaetus pachyosteus, with varying results. Estimates based on humerus length yield a mere 2.9 kg (6.4 lb), but this is deemed to be an underestimate considering the robust nature of the elements. The least circumference of the humerus meanwhile suggests a more expected weight of 9 kg (20 lb), while the least circumference of the femur might even support a weight of up to 13 kg (29 lb). However, like with humerus length the weight of the femur is likely to be incorrect, as this element often yields overestimates. Dynatoaetus gaffae expectedly yielded higher weight estimates than its relatives, with the least circumference of the tibiotarsus indicating a weight of up to 12 kg (26 lb), while the least circumference of the femur, which again likely represents an overestimate, resulted in a weight of up to 19 kg (42 lb). Mather and colleagues point out that the large differences among the results is caused by the used algorithms, which are built around a wide variety of vastly different birds. They further highlight that these algorithms generally favour length, not taking into account how weight would be influenced by how robustly built certain birds, like Dynatoaetus, were. They conclude that Dynatoaetus gaffae most likely reached a weight of around 12 kg (26 lb), whereas Dynatoaetus pachyosteus would be at least several kilos lighter.

== Phylogeny ==
Phylogenetic analysis on the fossil remains of Dynatoaetus used both molecular and morphological data in order to determine its relationship with other birds of prey, resulting in three most parsimonious trees. Nine anatomical characters connect Dynatoaetus to vultures of the subfamily Aegypiinae, however not all of these are unique to the group and may also be found in other birds of prey like some Gypaetinae and Perninae. In the strict consensus tree, it was recovered as the sister taxon to the aegypiine vultures and more basal than Cryptogyps. Together, Dynatoaetus and derived aegypiines clade with the serpent eagles of the subfamily Circaetinae, a group that includes the Philippine eagle. The Bayesian analysis shows similar results, with Dynatoaetus likewise being found in a position basal to modern aegypiines. The key difference is that in this analysis Cryptogyps was not found to be part of this clade and instead a much more basal bird of prey. The phylogenetic analysis conducted following the discovery of Dynatoaetus pachyosteus recover results much the same as the strict consensus of the earlier study. In this study the strict consensus placed both species in a polytomy with the Aegypiinae (including Cryptogyps), while the Bayesian analysis only differed in having the two species actually form a monophyletic clade.

Generally, the unique mix of characters seen in Dynatoaetus is thought to be in large part the result of combining phylogenetic traits inherited from its ancestry with morphological traits developed to support its lifestyle, rendering it difficult to determine its precise relationship but confirming its highly distinct nature. Regardless, the relationship between aegypiines and serpent eagles was recovered in all analysis conducted for this species. It could be possible that Dynatoaetus simply diverged from other aegypiine vultures prior to their diversification or that it convergently evolved anatomy similar to serpent eagles due to its predator habits.

- Accipitridae
  - Elaninae (elanine kites)
  - - - Gypaetinae (gypaetine vultures)
      - Perninae (honey buzzards and kin)
    - - - Circaetinae (serpent eagles)
        - - - Dynatoaetus gaffae
            - Dynatoaetus pachyosteus
          - - Cryptogyps lacertosus
            - Aegypiinae (aegypiine vultures)
      - - - Harpiinae (forest eagles)
          - Aquilinae (booted eagles)
        - - Accipitrinae (true hawks)
          - - Buteoninae (buzzards and kin)
            - Haliaeetinae (sea eagles and kites)

== Palaeobiology ==
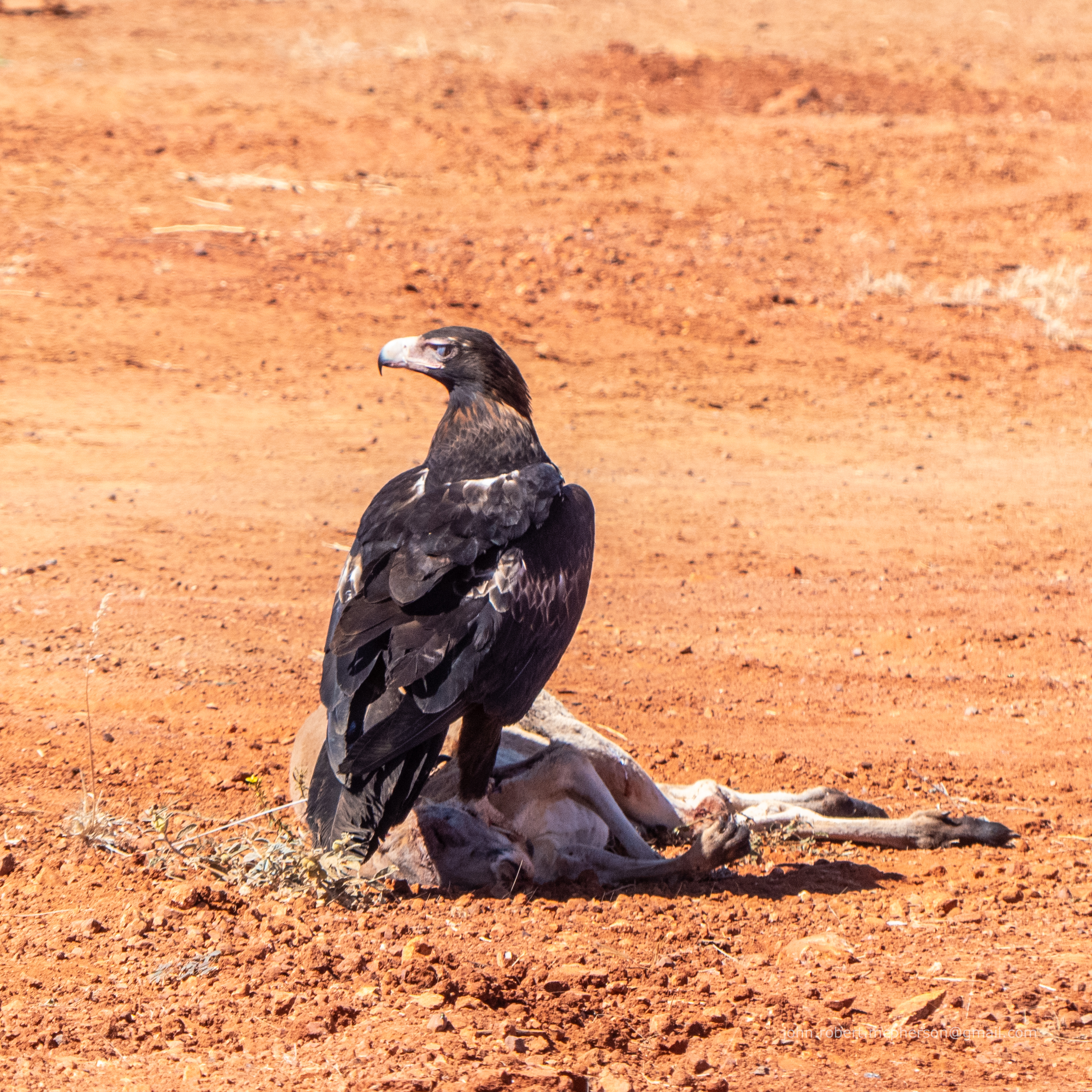
Dynatoaetus may have occupied a similar niche to that of modern wedge-tailed eagles, hunting large prey while also scavenging

Although fossil material of Dynatoaetus is currently limited to the centre and south-east of Australia, specifically South Australia and New South Wales, this may not reflect the raptor's actual range and could instead be simply the result of preservation and collection bias as well as the fact that large predators are inherently rarer than other animals. Mather et al. thus suggest that this bird of prey may have been much more widespread during the Pleistocene. Regardless of its hypothetical range, Dynatoaetus appears to have inhabited a variety of habitats, from the dry inland of Australia to the more temperate coastal regions.

While Dynatoaetus was much larger than the extant wedge-tailed eagle, the foot span of the two was rather similar due to the former's proportionally short toes. They were however notably more robust, which is thought to be an adaptation towards tackling larger prey items due to the increased strength of the talons. The short but robust toes would have allowed this bird to attack and maintain a grip on large prey even as it struggled. This is supported by the deep and robust pelvis, which allowed for the attachment of powerful musculature. Similar adaptations can be seen in a variety of other large predatory birds, including both the African crowned eagle and the South American harpy eagle, both of which are known to hunt both primates and small ungulates like antelopes and peccaries respectively. A geographically closer example would be Haast's eagle from the Pleistocene and Holocene of New Zealand, which hunted the giant moas of its home. Pleistocene Australia would have been abundant in potential prey, which could have included kangaroos, short-faced kangaroos, juvenile and weak giant wombats, megapodes and flightless birds such as Genyornis. Unlike the large, insular Haasts eagle however, Dynatoaetus had to compete for resources with other large carnivores like the monitor lizard Megalania, the terrestrial crocodile Quinkana and marsupial predators such as Thylacoleo, which would have impacted its behaviour and niche. There is also the matter of both species coexisting with one another, suggesting that they must have differed in some of their habits. This may be explained through different habitat or prey differences.

The wings of Dynatoaetus, which were short and robust, indicate that it adopted a flapping flying style which has also been likened to that of Haast's eagle.

Like other modern eagles, Dynatoaetus was likely not above scavenging as well, even if it lacked the specific adaptations that characterise more derived vultures. This would have put the raptor in competition with the smaller Cryptogyps. Given its size and similar interactions observed in modern scavenging birds, it is believed that Dynatoaetus would have been able to dominate carcasses when coming into contact with its smaller relative. Dynatoaetus would have also been in competition with eagles of the genus Aquila, as remains of wedge-tailed eagles are known from some of the same localities as the larger raptor. It is hypothesised that Pleistocene wedge-tailed eagles may have been more limited in their ecology due to the pressure put on them by Dynatoaetus as hunters and Cryptogyps as scavengers. As a large vulture-like raptor capable of killing its own prey as well as scavenging, Dynatoaetus was also comparable to the lappet-faced vulture of Africa, which is known to kill mammals up to the size of a juvenile impala.

Dynatoaetus likely went extinct approximately 50,000 years ago during the late Pleistocene, coinciding with the extinction of much of Australia's endemic megafauna and the disappearance of the scavenging Cryptogyps. It is possible that these extinctions also lead to the rise of the wedge-tailed eagle to the position as apex raptor in Australia, now able to occupy a more generalist niche.
