= Cryptogyps =

Cryptogyps Temporal range: Pleistocene, 0.77–0.050 Ma

Scientific classification
- Kingdom: Animalia
- Phylum: Chordata
- Class: Aves
- Order: Accipitriformes
- Family: Accipitridae
- Subfamily: Aegypiinae
- Genus: †Cryptogyps; Mather, Lee & Worthy, 2022
- Species: †C. lacertosus

Binomial name
- †Cryptogyps lacertosus (de Vis, 1905)

Synonyms
- “Taphaetus” lacertosus de Vis, 1905

Extinct genus of vultures

Cryptogyps is an extinct genus of Old World vulture from the Pleistocene of Australia. It was relatively small for a vulture but still larger than the extant wedge-tailed eagle. Originally described as an eagle in 1905 (under the binomial name Taphaetus lacertosus), in 2022 it was reidentified as a vulture, the first known example from the continent. Phylogenetic analysis suggests it either being a sister species to the extant, widespread Eurasian vulture genus Gyps or as a more basal member of the subfamily. The identification of Cryptogyps as a vulture solves a longstanding mystery about the lack of specialized lineages of large scavenging birds in Australia despite being present on every other continent aside from Antarctica. It is likely that Cryptogyps went extinct towards the end of the Pleistocene due to the disappearance of the megafauna it depended on for carrion. The genus contains a single species, C. lacertosus.

== History and naming ==
Cryptogyps has a long and complicated taxonomic history. It was initially described as “Taphaetus” lacertosus by Charles Walter De Vis in 1905 based on the lower part of a humerus and a quadrate bone of Middle-Late Pleistocene age, found around Kalamurina in South Australia. The assignment of the fossil material to "Taphaetus" by De Vis was problematic, as the genus had been declared a junior synonym of Uroaetus by De Vis himself earlier that same year. Later still Uroaetus was deemed synonymous with Aquila, as the type specimen was found to be identical to the modern wedge-tailed eagle. Subsequently, the genus "Taphaetus" was unavailable in accordance with the rules of the International Code of Zoological Nomenclature (ICZN). In 1974 Gerard Frederick van Tets suggested that "T." lacertosus was a member of the genus Icthyophaga (now synonymous with Haliaeetus) and designated the humerus as the lectotype before later placing the species in the subfamily Gypaetinae, which at the time contained all old-world vultures. A thorough examination of the lectotype humerus was published by Mather, Lee and Worthy in 2022 in order to determine if the material represented a distinct taxon. Their research concluded that the fossil not only belonged to a distinct genus and species of bird of prey, but also that it was a type of aegypiine vulture rather than a type of eagle. To reflect all this, the genus Cryptogyps was coined. Aside from the type material, fossils of indeterminate Pleistocene age were discovered in the Wellington Caves (New South Wales) and Nullarbor Plain (Western Australia). A year later additional material from the Green Waterhole, also known as the Fossil Cave, in the Tantanoola District (South Australia) was described and referred to Cryptogyps. Other material referred to Cryptogyps in the same study includes fossils from the Leaena's Breath Cave (Nullarbor Plain), Wellington Caves and the Walli Caves.

The name Cryptogyps is a combination of the Ancient Greek "kryptos" and "gyps", meaning "hidden" and "vulture" respectively. This name reflects the fact that despite having been known for over a century, the animal's identity as a vulture had remained largely unknown. Additionally, the name also contains the word "crypt", which as an underground burial site matches the discovery of fossil material in caves. The species name means "powerful".

== Description ==
Despite being close in size to the large wedge-tailed eagle (Aquila audax), Cryptogyps had more robust wings. It's described unusually small for an aegypiine vulture, with only the extant hooded vulture (Necrosyrtes monachus) being smaller. Multiple different approaches were taken to determine the mass of Cryptogyps, with values derived from the humeral articular facet length of the coracoid and the shaft width resulting in an estimated weight of 11–12 kg (24–26 lb). Total length meanwhile recovered a much lower value of only 3 kg (6.6 lb). Mather and colleagues reason that this massive difference is likely caused by the wide range of bird species that the used algorithm was based on. They argue that the true weight of Cryptogyps was likely somewhere in between these results, concluding that Cryptogyps most likely weighed between 3–6 kg (6.6–13.2 lb), a similar range to that of the modern wedge-tailed eagle.

== Phylogeny ==
Initially three phylogenetic trees were recovered using a combination of both morphological and molecular data. These analysis provide moderate support for the fact that Cryptogyps was part of the clade containing aegypiine vultures and serpent eagles, with strong support for its placement in the former. The key traits that appear to place Cryptogyps in this subfamily appear to be two synapomorphies of the tarsometatarsus. Within vultures, it may have been closely related to the modern genus Gyps, which contains the modern griffon vultures. However this relationship is only poorly supported and later analysis conducted after the discovery of Dynatoaetus find different placements. In Mather et al. (2023), Cryptogyps was recovered in a more basal position outside the aegypiine crown but more derived than Dynatoaetus. The Bayesian analysis of the same publication recovers it in an even more basal position, as a sister taxon to the clade containing aegypiine vultures, serpent eagles, booted eagles, forest eagles, true hawks, buzzards, sea eagles and kites. However, this placement of Cryptogyps as its own separate branch was only weakly supported. The phylogenetic analysis conducted following the description of the second species of Dynatoaetus mirror the results of Mather's prior work, finding Cryptogyps as nesting just outside the modern aegypiine vultures while also strengthening this conclusion through the new material.

The two phylogenetic trees below show the strict consensus trees of both Mather, Lee and Worthy (2022) and Mather et al. (2023).

- Accipitridae
  - Elaninae (elanine kites)
  - - - Gypaetinae (gypaetine vultures)
      - Perninae (honey buzzards and kin)
    - - - Circaetinae (serpent eagles)
        - Aegypiinae
          - - Sarcogyps calvus (red-headed vulture)
            - - Trigonoceps occipitalis (white-headed vulture)
              - - Aegypius monachus (monk vulture)
                - Torgos tracheliotos (lappet-faced vulture)
          - - Necrosyrtes monachus (hooded vulture)
            - - † Cryptogyps lacertosus
              - - Gyps fulvus (Eurasian griffon vulture)
                - Gyps coprotheres (cape vulture)
      - - - Harpiinae (forest eagles)
          - Aquilinae (booted eagles)
        - - Accipitrinae (true hawks)
          - - Buteoninae (buzzards and kin)
            - Haliaeetinae (sea eagles and kites)

- Accipitridae
  - Elaninae (elanine kites)
  - - - Gypaetinae (gypaetine vultures)
      - Perninae (honey buzzards and kin)
    - - - Circaetinae (serpent eagles)
        - - † Dynatoaetus gaffae
          - - † Cryptogyps lacertosus
            - Aegypiinae (aegypiine vultures)
      - - - Harpiinae (forest eagles)
          - Aquilinae (booted eagles)
        - - Accipitrinae (true hawks)
          - - Buteoninae (buzzards and kin)
            - Haliaeetinae (sea eagles and kites)

== Paleobiology ==
The legs of Cryptogyps match the overall morphology of the generalized aegypiine hindlimb, with only shallow groves indicative of relatively weak musculature. Although the morphology is still somewhat better developed than in extant vultures, it is nowhere near as pronounced as in active predators such as the wedge-tailed eagle. It is thus likely that Cryptogyps were primarily scavengers, feeding upon dead or dying Australian megafauna and at times traveled great distances while searching for carrion. However, a later study also concluded that the bones of Cryptogyps are less pneumatized than those of modern vultures, which indicates that it was not as well adapted at long-distance soaring as extant species. Assuming that the size of this vulture correlates with its general feeding preference, as observed in its modern relatives, Cryptogyps may have been a "gulper" or "ripper" type scavenger. This means that it may have either fed on the soft parts of carcasses, such as the internal organs, or that it may have ripped open flesh and skin. Regardless of the specifics, this would have provided a valuable ecological service by reducing disease transmission and facilitating energy flow. While nothing conclusive can be said about the specifics of its behavior, the hypothesis that Cryptogyps is related to extant griffon vultures could mean that they at times gathered in large numbers. Such social groups formed during scavenging could have provided multiple advantages, such being an aid during foraging while also driving off other scavengers. Another possibility is that Cryptogyps could have been a solitary animal or that it foraged in pairs. Still, Cryptogyps may not have been uncontested as a scavenger. In addition to the native marsupials like thylacines and Sarcophilus as well as monitor lizards, the contemporary Dynatoaetus was a notably larger bird and, assuming that it behaved in a similar fashion to the extant wedge-tailed eagle, may have not been above scavenging when the opportunity presented itself. The sheer size of Dynatoaetus may have allowed it to successfully dominate over the smaller Cryptogyps should the two have fought over a single carcass. Similar interactions are known from Africa, where large raptors would occasionally follow vultures and drive them away from carcasses.

Given the discovery of remains across Australia, from Western Australia to New South Wales, it is possible that Cryptogyps may have been a widespread species across the continent, foraging in grassland and open woodland environments. Following the extinction of most Australian megafauna during the Quaternary extinction event about 50,000 years ago, Cryptogyps may have also gone extinct due to a lack of carrion to feed on. While large bodied kangaroos would later grow in numbers and spread into environments they did not previously inhabit, this shift may have come too late for Cryptogyps. The extinction of Cryptogyps is thought to have allowed the wedge-tailed eagle to more easily exploit this resource and become Australia's primary scavenging bird species given the lack of specialised competition.
