= Macroderma godthelpi =

Scientific classification
- Kingdom: Animalia
- Phylum: Chordata
- Class: Mammalia
- Order: Chiroptera
- Family: Megadermatidae
- Genus: Macroderma
- Species: †M. godthelpi

Binomial name
- †Macroderma godthelpi Hand, 1985

Fossil species of bat

Macroderma godthelpi is a species of bat known from fossil material found in Australia, one of the larger carnivorous megadermatid family of the order Chiroptera. They resembled the modern species Macroderma gigas, known as a false vampire or ghost bat, although significantly smaller than any other species of Macroderma.

== Taxonomy ==
The description of Macroderma godthelpi was published in 1985 by the palaeontologist Suzanne Hand, separating Miocene fossil material discovered at the Riversleigh World Heritage Area as a new species of Macroderma. The type material was selected from Gag site at Riversleigh, which were examined with other specimens obtained at a nearby named as the Microsite. The holotype is part of a right maxillary, still retaining several of the bat's teeth.

The specific epithet honour a fellow researcher of the author, Henk Godthelp, who had noticed the first evidence of the fossil deposits containing the diverse and numerous bats that would be discovered at Riversleigh.

== Description ==
A species of the family Megadermatidae, predators with dentition that assists in the capture and consumption of insects or vertebrate animals.

== Distribution ==
Macroderma godthelpi was discovered in an area of northwest Queensland that was dominated by rainforest during the early Miocene, overlying a karst system that provided roosting opportunities for a diverse array of bat species. The Riversleigh fauna is represented by megadermatid species and others of the order Chiroptera, often creating well preserved fossil depositions at the floor of limestone caves. The sites of former bat eyries at Riversleigh included the remains of themselves and prey selected from the local fauna, with butchered parts and defecated fragments becoming preserved in conditions ideal for fossilisation.

A depiction of the species by Peter Schouten was published in 1983, two years before the formal description. The illustration gave a reconstruction of the animal, based on the ongoing research into fossil specimens, that showed it clasping a small bird, a passerine species of the Riversleigh fauna whose remains have been found beneath their feeding roost.
