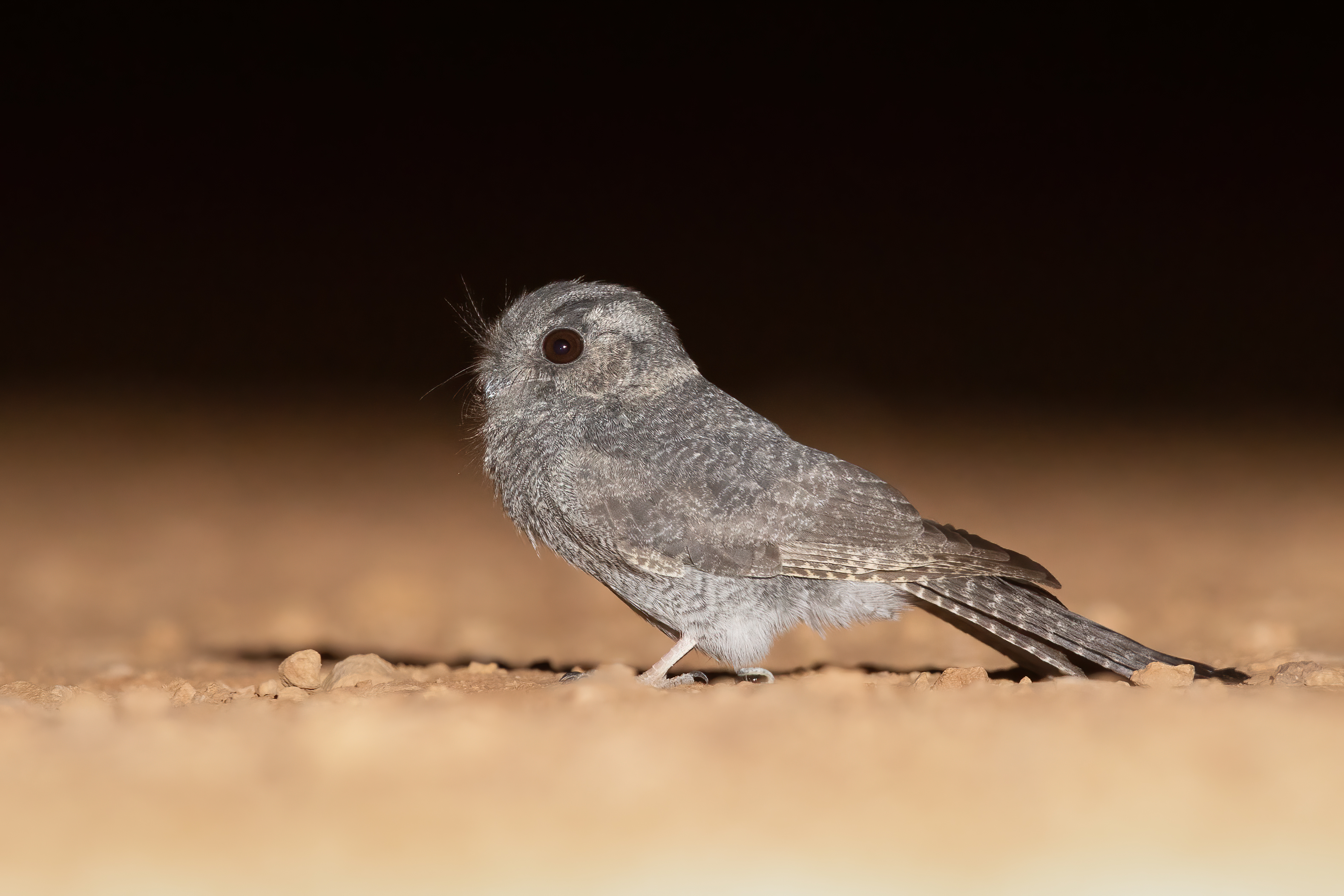
- In New South Wales

Conservation status
- Least Concern (IUCN 3.1)

Scientific classification
- Kingdom: Animalia
- Phylum: Chordata
- Class: Aves
- Order: Aegotheliformes
- Family: Aegothelidae
- Genus: Aegotheles
- Species: A. cristatus

Binomial name
- Aegotheles cristatus (Shaw, 1790)
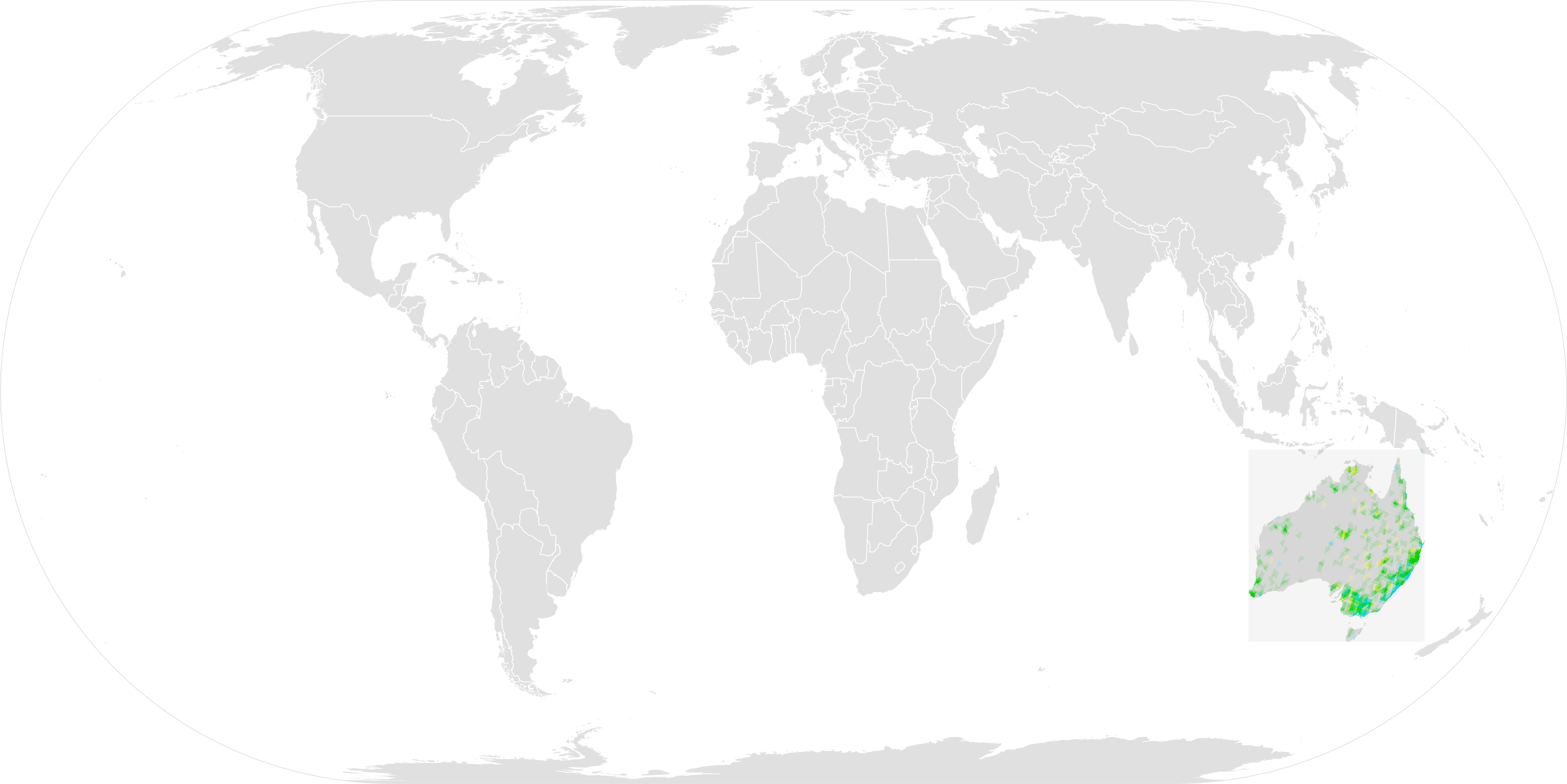
- Global range Year-Round Range Summer Range Winter Range

= Australian owlet-nightjar =

Species of bird

The Australian owlet-nightjar (Aegotheles cristatus) is a nocturnal bird found in open woodland across Australia and in southern New Guinea. It is the smallest nocturnal bird found in Australia, making it prone to predation. It is colloquially known as the moth owl or fairy owl and Jarlajirrpi by the Warlpiri people. It is the most common nocturnal bird in Australia. Despite suffering from predation and competition by introduced species, it is not considered threatened.

== Taxonomy ==
The Australian owlet-nightjar was formally described as Caprimulgus cristatus in 1790 by the English naturalist George Shaw based on a specimen collected in New South Wales, Australia. The species was described in the same year by John Latham as Caprimulgus novaehollandiae but Shaw's account is believed to be earlier and thus has precedence. The Australian owlet-nightjar was previously placed in Caprimulgiformes but updated taxonomy now places it in Aegotheliformes. The Australian owlet-nightjar is now one of ten species placed in the genus Aegotheles that was introduced in 1827 by the naturalists Nicholas Vigors and Thomas Horsfield. It is the type species of the genus. The specific epithet cristatus is Latin meaning "crested", "plumed" or "tufted".

Two subspecies are recognised:

- A. c. cristatus (Shaw, 1790) – Trans-Fly (central south New Guinea), Port Moresby area (southeast New Guinea) and Australia
- A. c. tasmanicus Mathews, 1918 – Tasmania (southeast Australia)

== Description ==
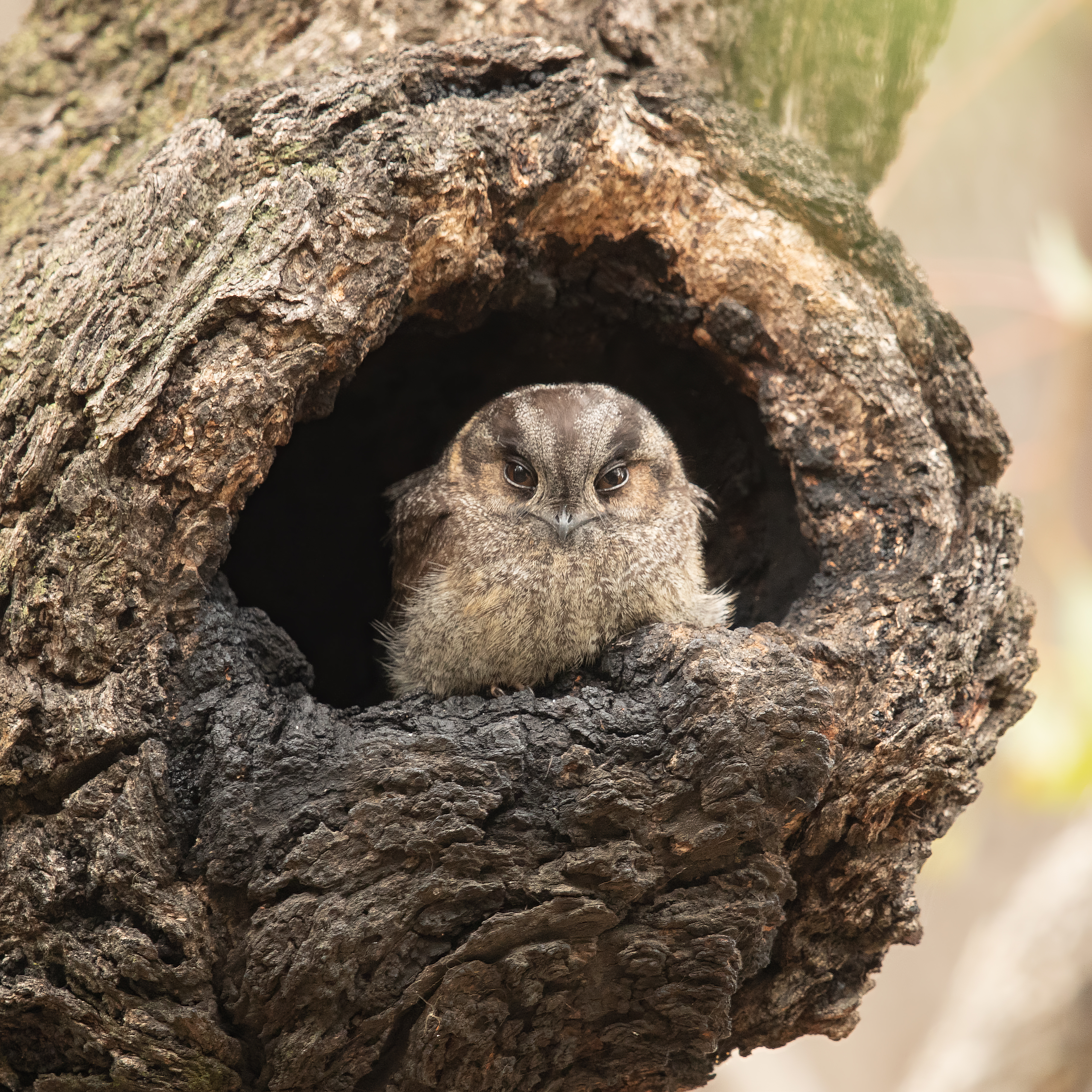
Australian owlet-nightjar mainly nests in tree hollows.

The Australian owlet-nightjar is It is 21–25 cm long, making it a small to medium-sized owlet-nightjar with grey upperparts and a white, barred front and a distinct dark and pale patterning on the head. It has large dark eyes that are non-reflective when a light is shone upon them; unlike many other nocturnal birds. In northern Australia, females can also have a rufous morph. It is possible that males also have a rufous morph in this area, but it is far less distinct in comparison to the female's. This rufous morph is only in the north of Australia and is not found in coastal south eastern Australia. Hatchlings are covered in dense white down, which is replaced by grey down after about 10 days; this grey down is then replaced with juvenile plumage. Juvenile birds are similar to adults, with slightly more spotting, shorter face bristles, and blurred markings on the face and nape. The plumage is overall paler in desert populations.

Australian owlet-nightjars are adapted to live in open woodland, with more pointed wings and larger feet, unlike most of the rest of the family that live in dense forest (though some individuals of this species can and do live in such habitat in Queensland and New Guinea).

== Physiology ==
=== Thermoregulation ===
Australian owlet-nightjars have an overall higher body temperature in summer and lower body temperature in winter. To combat lower temperatures in winter, Australian owlet-nightjars increase feather insulation to keep warm. During summer, Australian owlet-nightjars build up fat deposits, of which they have fully used up by mid-winter. Australian owlet-nightjars are nocturnal hunters, and in winter they have the advantage of longer periods of darkness for hunting, despite struggling with lower abundance of arthropods to eat. While resting during the day, Australian owlet-nightjars select roosts that are warmed by the sun to lower the energy required to keep them warm.

In hot weather, birds use evaporative cooling to cool their body temperature. This relies on panting and gular fluttering. Being a nocturnal species, Australian owlet-nightjars are reluctant to leave roost sites during the day, and cannot seek out water to rehydrate that lost from panting. To conserve water and avoid leaving their roost, Australian owlet-nightjars have an efficient thermoregulation system to prevent excessive moisture loss and dehydration, making them highly heat tolerant. Australian owlet-nightjars roost in hollows which protects them from full exposure to the sun and heat during the day; this is possibly why they are comparatively less heat-tolerant than related species that roost out in the open on arid ground.

=== Torpor ===
Australian owlet-nightjars are well known for frequently entering torpor, and during winter in Australia this often happens daily. They usually enter torpor once a day around dawn for 3–4 hours, if they enter torpor twice in a day it is always a morning bout followed by a bout in the afternoon or night. Australian owlet-nightjars prefer roosting in tree hollows, but will occasionally roost in rock cavities, which are warmer and more temperature stable. In one study, Australian owlet-nightjars that roosted in rocks entered torpor half as often as those roosting in trees, and if they entered a second torpor it was more likely to be in the afternoon, while those in tree crevices were more likely to enter a second torpor at night. Australian owlet-nightjars tend to enter torpor when the atmospheric temperature is below 6.8 °C but may even do so at temperatures as high as 14.5 °C.

Torpor can be used to protect against fluctuating temperatures or food shortages by reducing the body's metabolism, heart rate, and temperature. Australian owlet-nightjars enter torpor more during periods of low arthropod abundance, likely to conserve energy and reduce the need for food. Australian owlet-nightjars do not enter torpor during the breeding season due to warm temperatures and an abundance of arthropods.

== Habitat and distribution ==
Australian-owlet nightjars are widespread in Australia and are a hollow-dependent species, meaning they use tree hollows for both roosting and nesting. In Australia they can be found in suburban and urban-fringe environments. Rivers and waterways are important to this species; a study in Australia found that they were more likely to be found in areas with waterways than those without.

They are found in a variety of habitats such as open woodland, mallee scrub, tropical woodlands, and occasionally mangroves, open grasslands, and rainforests. In New Guinea this species is commonly found in savannah, while in Australia it has a preference for open mature woodland and habitats containing eucalyptus and acacia.

== Behaviour ==
=== Vocalizations ===
The Australian owlet-nightjar is frequently heard but not often seen. Adult Australian owlet-nightjars appear to have a few main calls described as: "churr, cry, yuk, cho-ok, hiss, screech and other short harsh rattling notes".

=== Roosting ===
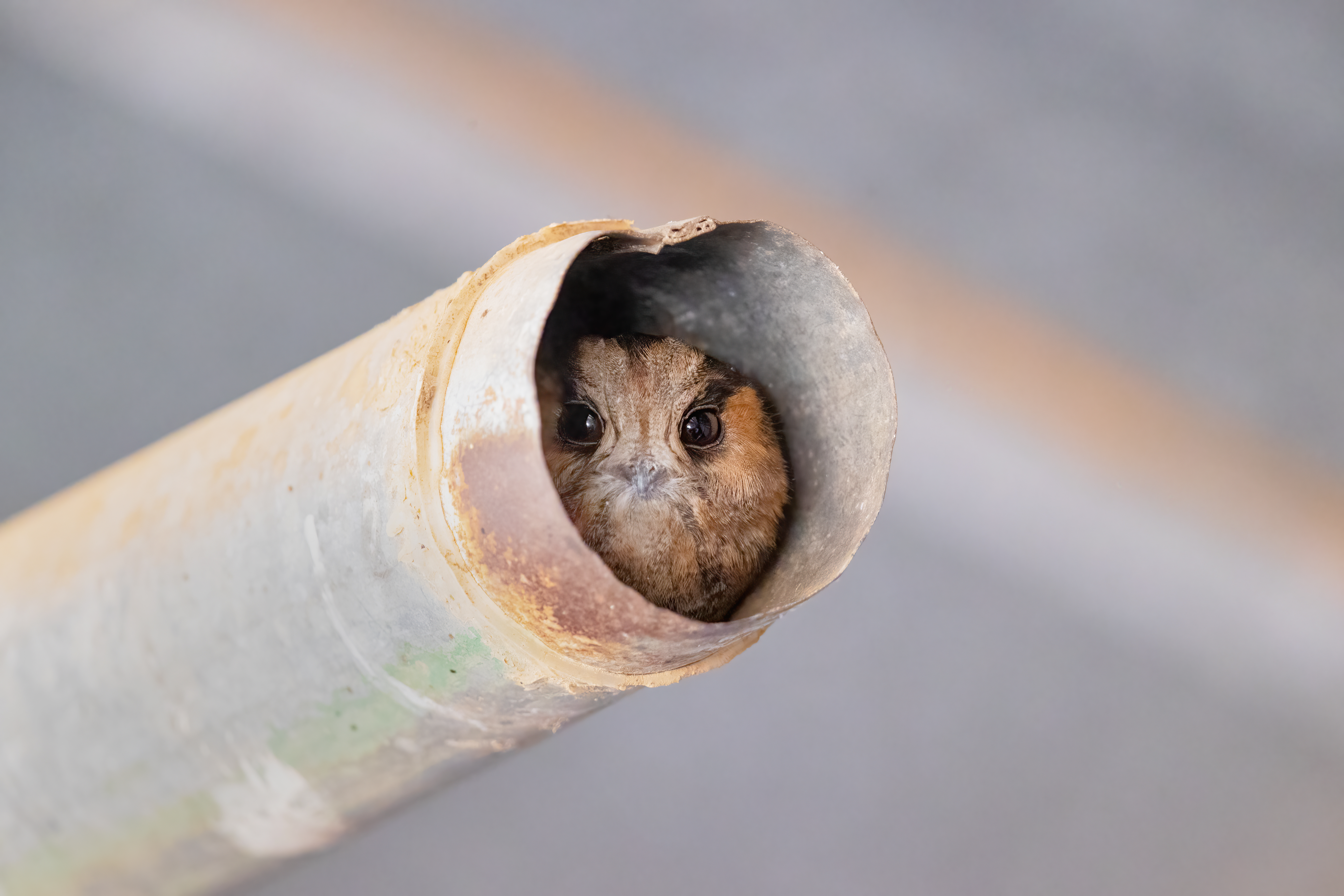
Australian owlet-nightjar roosting in a man-made structure

Australian owlet-nightjars prefer roosting in tree hollows that are closer to the ground and in areas of trees with lots of other cavities. On average they move between roost sites over a distance of about 300 m every nine days and in one study used between two and six different cavities over a six month period. The same study found that Australian owlet-nightjars tended to roost alone and favoured stringybark and manna gum. They were also found in yellow box, red gum, apple box, and two dead Eucalyptus trees that could not be identified to species. Cavity choice is essential as Australian owlet-nightjars spend more than half their time roosting. It is still unknown why Australian owlet-nightjars use hollows to roost, as many related species roost in the open on tree limbs or on the ground. Some hypotheses are predation and ectoparasite avoidance, based on similar behaviour in bats, but further research is needed.

Normally Australian owlet-nightjars roost in tree hollows and snags but there are records of them roosting in man-made structures like forestry boom gates in Tasmania. These gates are used to restrict access to private and crown land and when opened occasionally flush Australian owlet-nightjars that were roosting inside. They have also been found roosting in roof cavities and chimneys.

=== Threat display ===
Australian owlet-nightjars are often quiet and passive when disturbed. Many accounts of them being encountered in nest boxes report that they sit quietly on their eggs or young, occasionally flushing if they sense approaching danger. There are a few anecdotal reports of Australian owlet-nightjars flattening themselves or puffing up to seem larger, swaying side to side, opening their mouths wide to show their pink gape and hissing. Both young and older birds have been reported to do this when disturbed while roosting or nesting.

=== Hunting and diet ===
Australian owlet-nightjars are sally type foragers and rarely forage from the ground. They hunt almost exclusively at night, perhaps as a way to mitigate predation. They use their large eyes, good hearing, and rictal bristles to locate and capture prey. The Australian owlet-nightjar feeds at night by diving from perches and snatching insects from the air, ground or off trunks and branches, in the manner of a flycatcher. It may also feed on the wing. It feeds on most insects, particularly beetles, grasshoppers and ants.

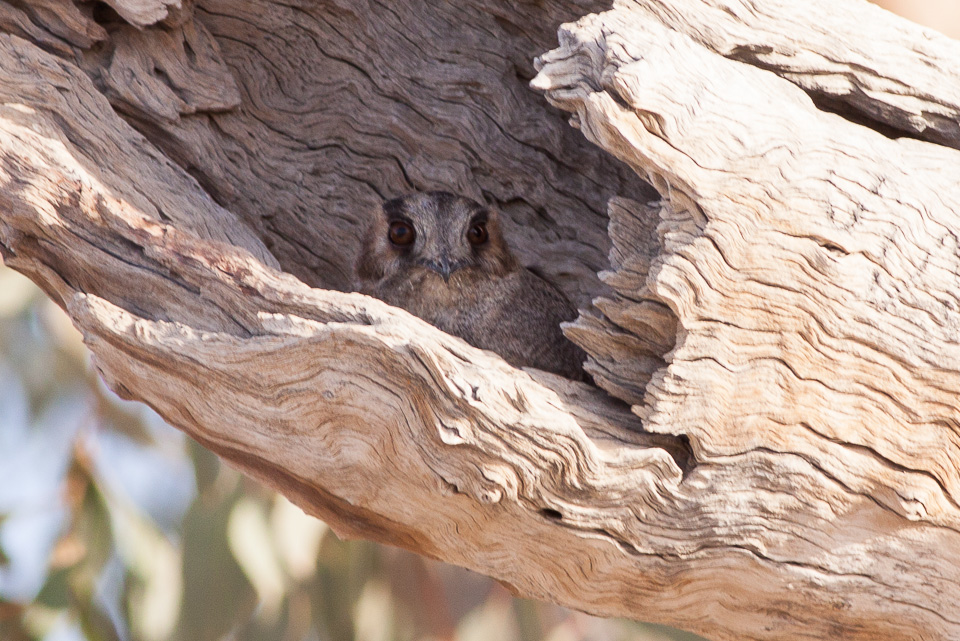
Australian owlet-nightjar in a tree hollow

Australian owlet-nightjars are considered "lunarphilic", which means they prefer hunting on nights with moonlight and are crepuscular (hunting at dawn and dusk). Australian owlet-nightjars that hunt on moonlit nights face a trade-off, as they hunt using vision but are also at a greater risk from predation by other visual hunters (e.g. owls). Australian owlet-nightjars are relatively small and so face higher rates of predation than related species; this is likely why their hunting behaviour is reduced on nights with full moons, when they only hunt enough to meet their energy requirements.

The species is itself prey to another nocturnal carnivore, Macroderma gigas, a larger microchiropteran known as the ghost bat.

=== Reproduction ===
The Australian owlet-nightjar nests mainly in holes in trees (or in other holes and crevices), which are provisioned with leaves by both of the pair. It is thought that the frequent addition of eucalyptus leaves is because they act as a beneficial insecticide. Australian owlet-nightjar pairs are thought to mate for life, and pairs breed between August and December. Three or four eggs are laid and incubated by the female for just under a month. Both the adults feed the chicks, which fledge after a month. The young birds are reported to stay close to their parents for several months after they fledge.

== Relationship with humans ==
Australian owlet-nightjars have an important cultural significance to the Warlpiri people; it is thought of as connected to the kurdaitcha man, a ritual executioner. The Australian owlet-nightjars is called Jarlajirrpi and its call is said to warn of the approach of the kurdaitcha.

People also set up nesting boxes for Australian owlet-nightjars.

== Status and management ==
Australian owlet-nightjars are adaptable and are considered a least-concern species. They are threatened by logging and clearcutting for development and timber, which reduces their nesting and roosting habitat. They also face predation risk from introduced predators like foxes and cats. Forest and bush fires have increased in intensity and frequency due to climate change and pose a significant risk to roosting and nesting trees. Because they are primarily insectivores, pesticides pose a risk to their food source.
