= Macroderma malugara =

Scientific classification
- Kingdom: Animalia
- Phylum: Chordata
- Class: Mammalia
- Order: Chiroptera
- Family: Megadermatidae
- Genus: Macroderma
- Species: †M. malugara

Binomial name
- †Macroderma malugara Hand, 1996

Species of bat

Macroderma malugara is a species of bat known from fossil material found in Australia. The name describes a 'good killer' in the local language, and was similar in size and probably habits of the modern Macroderma gigas (known as the ghost bat). They ate a wide variety of animals in their rainforest environment, including birds, turtles, small crocodiles and other bats.

== Taxonomy ==
Macroderma malugara was described by the Australian palaeontologist Suzanne Hand in 1996. The author placed the new species in the genus Macroderma, recognising an affinity with the only extant species Macroderma gigas (ghost bat). The type location is the Gotham City Site at the Riversleigh World Heritage Area. The specific epithet malugara is derived from the indigenous Wanyi language and means 'good killer'.

The species is megadermatid of the suborder Microchiroptera within superfamily Rhinolophoidea.

== Description ==
The species is a member of the family Megadermatidae, carnivorous microchiropterans known as false vampire bats whose prey includes vertebrate animals. Macroderma malugara was around the size of the modern species, Macroderma gigas, but distinguished by characteristics that include the dentition. They appear to exhibit less shortening of the face, a trend that is discernible in the megadermatids that occur from the Oligo-Miocene until the present at Riversleigh sites; the change in the structure of the snout allowed greater pressure to be exerted by the jaws.

== Distribution ==
Specimens have been found in the Riversleigh fossil-bearing formations, at sites classified as middle Miocene (Faunal Zone C). The site of its discovery contains fossilised fragments of local fauna, which in analysis are consistent with a midden created the modern species. The species recorded at the former floor of the Gotham City site are a diverse assemblage of remains, and included animals that are only recorded at other sites, indicating they were captured some distance away and returned to what was its feeding roost.
