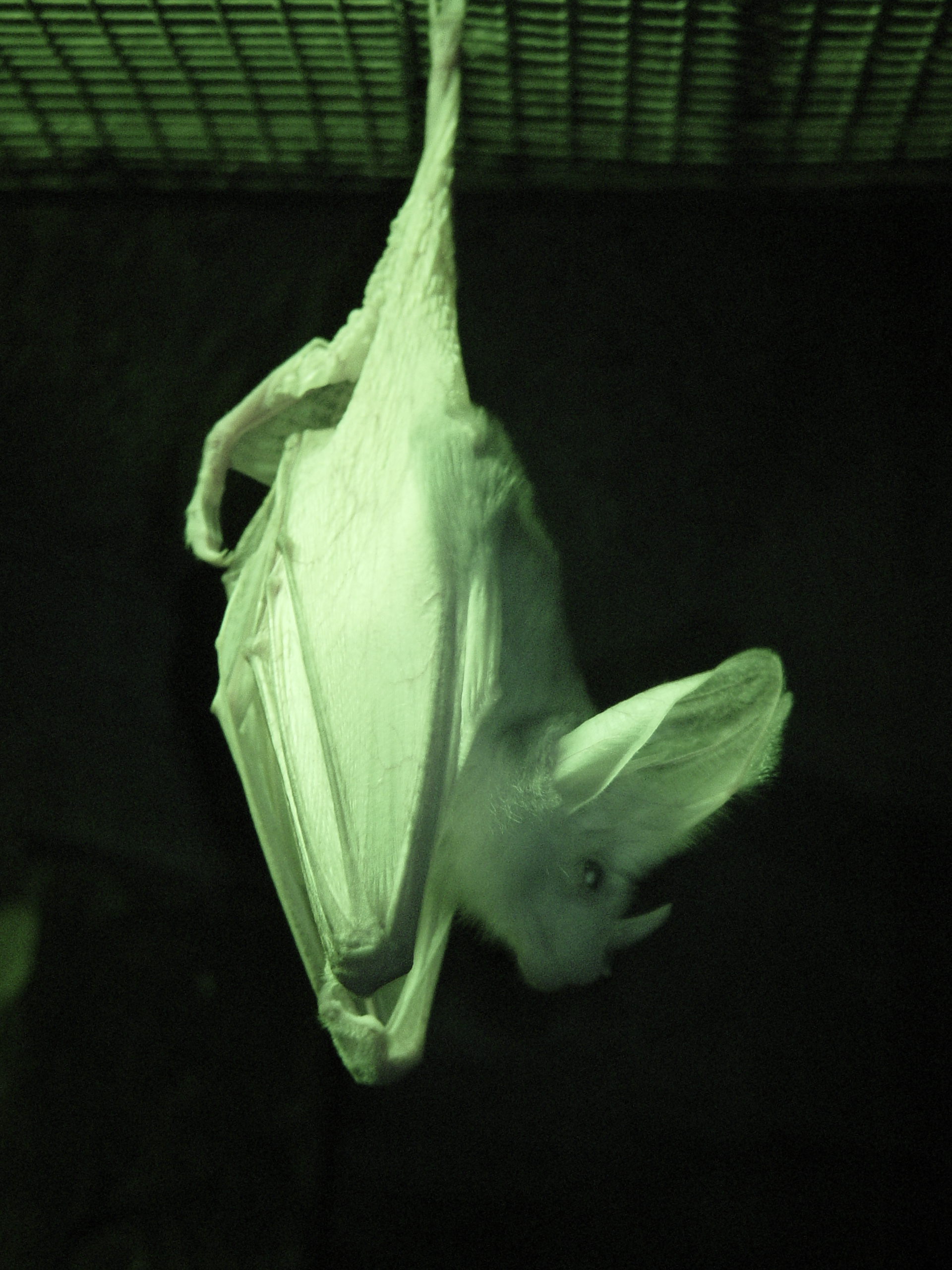
- Macroderma gigas

Scientific classification
- Kingdom: Animalia
- Phylum: Chordata
- Class: Mammalia
- Order: Chiroptera
- Family: Megadermatidae
- Genus: Macroderma; Miller 1906

Type species
- Megaderma gigas Dobson, 1880

= Macroderma (bat) =

Genus of bats

Macroderma is a genus of microbats, present in the fossil record and as one extant species. They have existed in Australia since the early Miocene.

== Taxonomy ==
The description to the genus was published in a revision of chiropterans by Gerrit Smith Miller Jr. in 1906, separating the type species from it placement in the genus Megaderma. The taxonomic placement is to family Megadermatidae of the suborder Microchiroptera.

The name Macroderma combines the Greek words macros (large) and derma (skin), due to the large size of their partially conjoined ears.

- Macroderma gigas Dobson, 1880 the only living species, a large predatory carnivore referred to as the Australian false vampyre or ghost bat
- †Macroderma godthelpi, a fossil taxon describing the earliest and smallest species
- †Macroderma koppa Hand, Dawson & Augee, 1988 a fossil species that existed in the Pliocene epoch
- †Macroderma malugara S. J. Hand, 1996

The genus describes an extant and fossil species that are endemic to Australian and known to have existed in the early Miocene. Descriptions of new species have emerged from excavations of specimens in caves at the southern part of the continent, along with sub-fossil remains at several sites. The extensive fossil record of the Riversleigh fauna has provided the most material and sequential evidence of Macroderma species, including their middens and associations with other bats, although this is restricted to the fossiliferous karst systems of the Riversleigh research area.
