= Wellington Caves =

Karst caves in New South Wales, Australia

- Location within New South Wales Location within Australia
- Coordinates: 32°37′15″S 148°56′17″E
- Geology: Early Devonian limestone

The Wellington Caves are a group of limestone karst caves located 8 kilometres (5.0 mi) south of Wellington, New South Wales, Australia.

== History ==
=== First accounts and fossils finds ===
The Wellington region was long inhabited by the 'Binjang mob' of the Wiradjuri people, who called the caves Mulwang, and may have associated a mythological spirit named Koppa with the caves. While there is no direct evidence that they entered any of the caves at Wellington, they certainly knew of their entrances. The first European record of the caves is a painting by Augustus Earle, who is known to have visited the Wellington Valley in 1826, and which clearly shows Aboriginal people in front of a fire at the entrance to what is now known as Cathedral Cave, identifiable by the landform which marks its entrance.

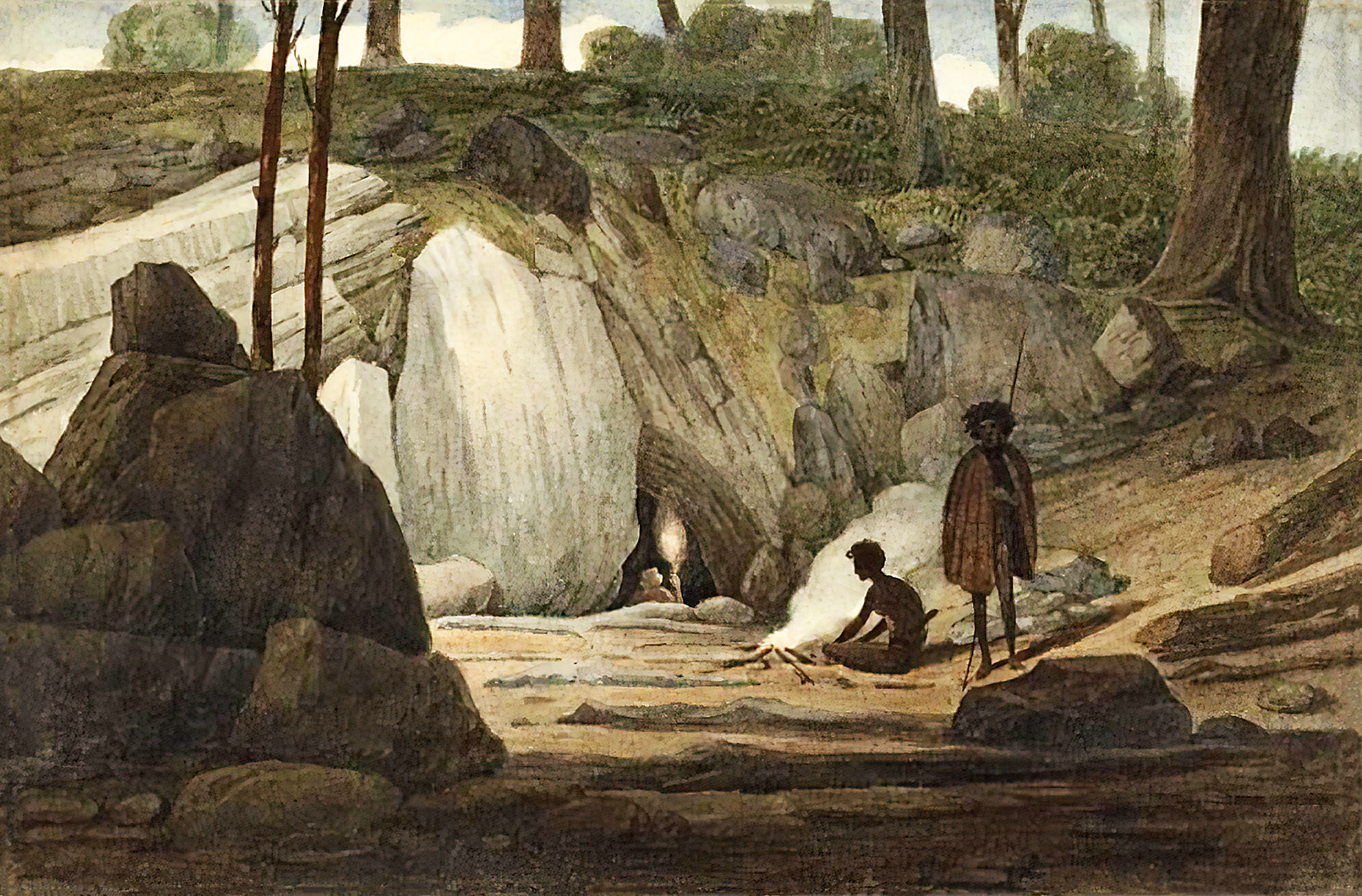
"Mosman's Cave" by Augustus Earle, 1826, depicting the entrance to what is now known as Cathedral Cave.

The first Europeans to explore the caves as depicted by Earle were probably associated with Lieutenant Percy Simpson's settlement (1823–1831), but the first written account was provided by explorer Hamilton Hume in 1828. Two years later George Ranken, a local magistrate, found fossil bones of both a diprotodon and a giant kangaroo in the caves. The diprotodon, which has been dated to the Pleistocene period was herbivorous and its teeth were well adapted to grazing.

Ranken returned later that year with Sir Thomas Mitchell and collected a huge variety of bones from the caves which appear to have acted as a natural trap for fauna. These remains became the subject of an address by Mitchell to the Geological Society of London in 1831.

Since that time the cave has been a steady source of information about ancient geology and fauna — especially when Gerard Krefft, Curator of the Australian Museum, conducted two separate extensive excavations (in 1866 and 1869) and collected many significant fossil specimens for the museum — although collapses and other geological phenomena have splintered and scattered skeletons.

=== Tours, mining and exploration ===
The caves were frequently vandalised during the nineteenth century until 1884, when they were declared a natural reserve. Organised tours of Cathedral Cave began about 1885 with the appointment of the first caretaker, James Sibbald. Gaden Cave was discovered in 1902 and developed in 1909. The Phosphate Mine was in production from 1914 to 1918 however only 6000 tons of rock with limited amounts of phosphate were removed.

Over many years since at least the late 1950s, members of the Sydney University Speleological Society (SUSS) have mapped extended and discovered new sections of caverns in the area, with a particular emphasis by SUSS on cave diving, which were responsible for the discovery of many of the now 26 known caves in the reserve. The most important discoveries have been McCavity Cave, a subterranean lake under Limekiln Cave and the rediscovery of Anticline Cave that had in the past been buried in the Wellington Caves Caravan Park.

The mostly backfilled and collapsed phosphate mine passages lay dormant for almost 80 years before they were reconstructed and reopened for tours in 1996.

== Geology ==
The caves at Wellington are located in an outcrop of Early Devonian limestone, which is about 400 million years old. That limestone is part of the Garra Formation.

== Tourism ==
By 1888 over 1,500 people a year were visiting them. Currently approximately 35,000 people visit the caves annually. Cathedral Cave, Gaden Cave and the Phosphate Mine are shown as guided tours, and in 2019 a new Visitor Experience Centre was constructed to include a Cafe, award winning museum exhibition and discovery classroom running lab sessions for families and children. There is also an onsite motel and caravan park offering motel rooms, powered sites and camping with amenities, swimming pool, kitchen and recreation room.

== Caves ==
=== Cathedral Cave ===
Cathedral cave opened for guided tours in 1885. Cathedral Cave is famous for its huge stalagmite known as Altar Rock which is 32 metres in circumference at its base and over 15 metres high.

An excavation at this site discovered an unknown species of bat that occupied the cave during the Pliocene epoch, several million years ago, and is related to the modern carnivore Macroderma gigas (ghost bat). The species was named Macroderma koppa in reference to Koppa, a spirit that was reported by indigenous informants to inhabit the cave.

=== Gaden Cave ===
Gaden Cave opened for guided tours since 1909. Gaden Cave is noted for its unusual and beautiful cave coral. It is named after the shire president at the time that the cave was discovered.

=== Phosphate Mine ===
Phosphate Mine opened for guided tours since 1996. Apart from viewing the old workings, visitors can see 800,000-year-old deposits containing fossil bones.

=== Other Caves ===
Other caves in the Wellington caves are not open for tourism.

==== Lime Kiln Cave ====
Lime Kiln Cave is the name given to the dry part of a large cave system, most of which is completely water-filled.

==== McCavity ====
McCavity is the under-water section of the cave which was discovered by members of the Sydney University Speleological Society.

==== Water Cave (Anticline Cave) ====
This is a small doline cave leading to water. It is in the process of being re-opened.

==== Big Sink ====
This is an old collapsed doline. It appears to be the route through which fossil-bearing sediments washed into the chambers below.

==== Mitchell's Cave ====
This is the site from which the first Australian fossils for scientific study were collected by George Ranken.
