= Little cave eptesicus =

Little cave eptesicus is a common name of a bat which may refer to:

- Vespadelus pumilus, eastern forest bat
- Vespadelus caurinus, northern cave bat
- Vespadelus finlaysoni, northern cave bat, Finlayson's cave bat
