= List of vespertilionines =

Species in mammal subfamily Vespertilioninae

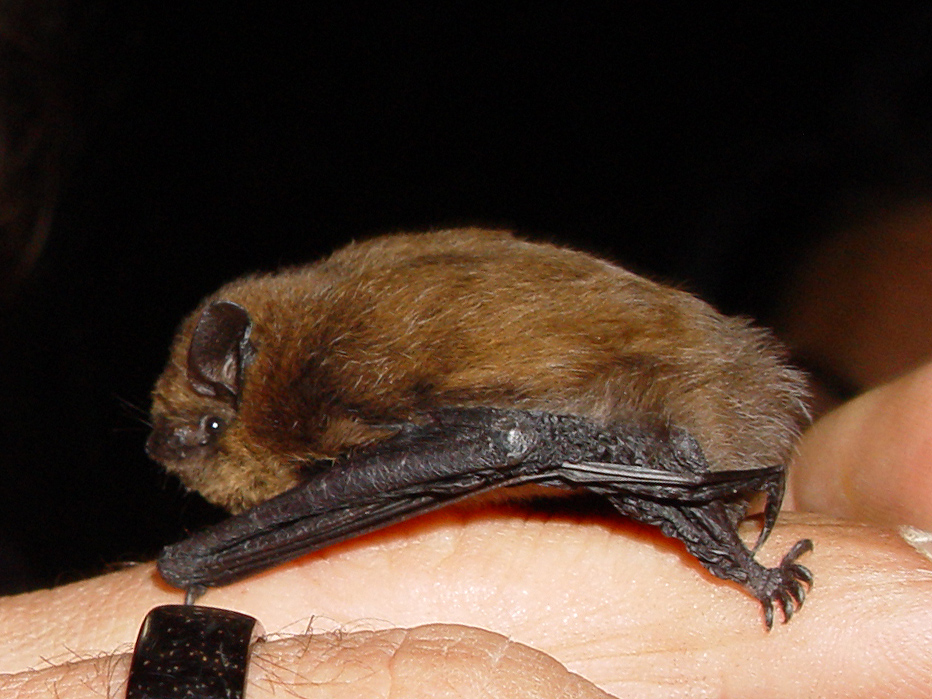
Common pipistrelle (Pipistrellus pipistrellus)

Vespertilioninae is one of the four subfamilies of Vespertilionidae, itself one of twenty families of bats in the mammalian order Chiroptera and part of the microbat suborder. A member of this subfamily is called a vespertilionine, or a vesper bat. They are found in all continents besides Antarctica, primarily in caves, forests, and rocky areas, though some species can also be found in shrublands, grasslands, or deserts. They range in size from the pygmy bamboo bat, at 2 cm (1 in) plus a 2 cm (1 in) tail, to the Schreber's yellow bat, at 13 cm (5 in) plus a 10 cm (4 in) tail. Like all bats, vespertilionines are capable of true and sustained flight, and have forearm lengths ranging from 2 cm (1 in) to 7 cm (3 in). They are all insectivorous and eat a variety of insects and spiders, with the exception of the greater noctule bat, which regularly eats small birds. Almost no vespertilionines have population estimates, though seven species—the New Caledonian wattled bat, Socotran pipistrelle, Rosevear's serotine, Japanese noctule, Madeira pipistrelle, Kityo's serotine, and Genoways's yellow bat—are categorized as endangered species, and five species—the New Zealand long-tailed bat, New Caledonian long-eared bat, New Guinea big-eared bat, Canary long-eared bat, and Sardinian long-eared bat—are categorized as critically endangered with populations as low as 40. Three species—the Lord Howe long-eared bat, Christmas Island pipistrelle, and Sturdee's pipistrelle—have been made extinct since 1500 CE.

The 323 extant species of Vespertilioninae are divided between 53 genera, ranging in size from 1 to 19 species. A few extinct prehistoric vespertilionine species have been discovered, though due to ongoing research and discoveries the exact number and categorization is not fixed.

== Conventions ==
IUCN Red List categories
Conservation status
- EX: Extinct (3 species)
- EW: Extinct in the wild (0 species)
- CR: Critically endangered (5 species)
- EN: Endangered (7 species)
- VU: Vulnerable (17 species)
- NT: Near threatened (14 species)
- LC: Least concern (174 species)

Other categories
- DD: Data deficient (58 species)
- NE: Not evaluated (45 species)

The author citation for the species or genus is given after the scientific name; parentheses around the author citation indicate that this was not the original taxonomic placement. Conservation status codes listed follow the International Union for Conservation of Nature (IUCN) Red List of Threatened Species. Range maps are provided wherever possible; if a range map is not available, a description of the vespertilionine's range is provided. Ranges are based on the IUCN Red List for that species unless otherwise noted. All extinct species or subspecies listed alongside extant species went extinct after 1500 CE, and are indicated by a dagger symbol "†". Population figures are rounded to the nearest hundred.

== Classification ==
Vespertilioninae, one of the four subfamilies of the family Vespertilionidae, contains 323 extant species divided into 53 genera, plus 3 species that have been made extinct in the modern era.

Subfamily Vespertilioninae

- Genus Afronycteris (African serotines): three species
- Genus Afropipistrellus (African pipistrelles): five species
- Genus Alionoctula (eastern pipistrelles): nineteen species
- Genus Antrozous (pallid bats): two species
- Genus Arielulus (gilded sprites): six species
- Genus Baeodon (yellow bats): two species
- Genus Barbastella (barbastelles): six species
- Genus Bauerus (Van Gelder's bat): one species
- Genus Cassistrellus (helmeted bats): two species
- Genus Chalinolobus (wattled bats): eight species
- Genus Cnephaeus (Old World serotine bats): fifteen species
- Genus Corynorhinus (American lump-nosed bats): four species
- Genus Eptesicus (serotine bats): two species
- Genus Euderma (spotted bat): one species
- Genus Falsistrellus (false pipistrelles): two species
- Genus Glauconycteris (butterfly bats): fifteen species
- Genus Glischropus (thick-thumbed bats): five species
- Genus Hesperoptenus (false serotines): five species
- Genus Histiotus (big-eared brown bats): eleven species
- Genus Hypsugo (Asian pipistrelles): sixteen species
- Genus Ia (great evening bat): one species
- Genus Idionycteris (Allen's big-eared bat): one species
- Genus Laephotis (African long-eared bats): nine species
- Genus Lasionycteris (silver-haired bat): one species
- Genus Lasiurus (red bats): twenty species
- Genus Mimetillus (Moloney's mimic bat): one species
- Genus Mirostrellus (Moloney's mimic bat): one species
- Genus Neoeptesicus (New World serotine bats): ten species
- Genus Neoromicia (serotines): six species
- Genus Nyctalus (noctule bats): eight species
- Genus Nycticeinops (serotines): three species
- Genus Nycticeius (evening bats): three species
- Genus Nyctophilus (Australian big-eared bats): seventeen species (one extinct)
- Genus Otonycteris (long-eared bats): two species
- Genus Parastrellus (canyon bat): one species
- Genus Perimyotis (tricolored bat): one species
- Genus Pharotis (New Guinea big-eared bat): one species
- Genus Philetor (Rohu's bat): one species
- Genus Pipistrellus (pipistrelles): sixteen species (two extinct)
- Genus Plecotus (lump-nosed bats): eighteen species
- Genus Pseudoromicia (sub-Saharan serotines): nine species
- Genus Rhogeessa (yellow bats): twelve species
- Genus Rhyneptesicus (Sind bat): one species
- Genus Scoteanax (Rüppell's broad-nosed bat): one species
- Genus Scotoecus (lesser house bats): five species
- Genus Scotomanes (harlequin bat): one species
- Genus Scotophilus (Old World yellow bats): twenty species
- Genus Scotorepens (broad-nosed bats): four species
- Genus Scotozous (Dormer's bat): one species
- Genus Tylonycteris (bamboo bats): six species
- Genus Vansonia (Rüppell's bat): one species
- Genus Vespadelus (forest bats): nine species
- Genus Vespertilio (parti-coloured bats): two species

== Vespertilionines ==
The following classification is based on the taxonomy described by the reference work Mammal Species of the World (2005), with augmentation by generally accepted proposals made since using molecular phylogenetic analysis, as supported by both the IUCN SSC Bat Specialist Group and the American Society of Mammalogists.

Genus Afronycteris – Monadjem, Patterson, & Demos, 2020 – three species
Common name	Scientific name and subspecies	Range	Size and ecology	IUCN status and estimated population
Banana serotine	A. nana Peters, 1852	Sub-Saharan Africa	Size: 4–5 cm (2 in), plus 2–4 cm (1–2 in) tail 2–4 cm (1–2 in) forearm length Habitat: Forest, savanna, and unknown	LC Unknown
Heller's serotine	A. helios (Heller, 1912)	Eastern Africa	Size: 3–5 cm (1–2 in), plus 2–4 cm (1–2 in) tail 2–3 cm (1 in) forearm length Habitat: Unknown	DD Unknown
Kruger serotine	A. rautenbachi Kearney, de Vries, & Markotter, 2026	Eastern and southern Africa	Size: 3–5 cm (1–2 in), plus 2–4 cm (1–2 in) tail 2–3 cm (1 in) forearm length Habitat: Unknown	NE Unknown

Genus Afropipistrellus – Thorn, Kock, & Cusin, 2020 – five species
Common name	Scientific name and subspecies	Range	Size and ecology	IUCN status and estimated population
Bellier's pipistrelle	A. bellieri (De Vree, 1972)	Western Africa	Size: 4–6 cm (2 in), plus 2–4 cm (1–2 in) tail 2–4 cm (1–2 in) forearm length Habitat: Forest	NE Unknown
Broad-headed serotine	A. crassulus (Thomas, 1904)	Western and central Africa	Size: 4–5 cm (2 in), plus 2–4 cm (1–2 in) tail 2–4 cm (1–2 in) forearm length Habitat: Forest	LC Unknown
Dobson's pipistrelle	A. grandidieri (Dobson, 1876)	Western and eastern Africa	Size: 5–6 cm (2 in), plus 3–4 cm (1–2 in) tail 3–4 cm (1–2 in) forearm length Habitat: Forest, savanna, and inland wetlands	DD Unknown
Happolds' pipistrelle	A. happoldorum (Hutterer, Decher, Monadjem, & Astrin, 1972)	Western Africa	Size: About 6 cm (2 in), plus 2–4 cm (1–2 in) tail 3–4 cm (1–2 in) forearm length Habitat: Forest	NE Unknown
Mouselike pipistrelle	A. musciculus Thomas, 1913	Western and central Africa	Size: About 4 cm (2 in), plus 2–3 cm (1 in) tail 2–3 cm (1 in) forearm length Habitat: Forest and savanna	DD Unknown

Genus Alionoctula – Kruskop, Solovyeva, & Kaznadzey, 2018 – nineteen species
Common name	Scientific name and subspecies	Range	Size and ecology	IUCN status and estimated population
Angulate pipistrelle	A. angulatus (Peters, 1880) Two subspecies: P. a. angulatus; P. a. ponceleti	Papua New Guinea and the Solomon Islands	Size: 3–5 cm (1–2 in), plus 2–5 cm (1–2 in) tail 3–4 cm (1–2 in) forearm length Habitat: Forest and caves	LC Unknown
Christmas Island pipistrelle†	A. murrayi (Andrews, 1900)	Christmas Island in Australia	Size: Unknown length Habitat: Forest	EX 0
Dhofar pipistrelle	A. dhofarensis (Benda, Reiter, Uhrin, & Varadínová, 2016)	Yemen and Oman	Size: 4–6 cm (2 in), plus 2–4 cm (1–2 in) tail 2–4 cm (1–2 in) forearm length Habitat: Caves and forest	NE Unknown
Endo's pipistrelle	A. endoi (Imaizumi, 1959)	Japan	Size: 4–5 cm (2 in), plus 2–4 cm (1–2 in) tail 3–4 cm (1–2 in) forearm length Habitat: Forest	NT Unknown
Forest pipistrelle	A. adamsi (Kitchener, Caputi, & Jones, 1986)	Northern Australia	Size: 3–5 cm (1–2 in), plus 2–4 cm (1–2 in) tail 2–4 cm (1–2 in) forearm length Habitat: Savanna and forest	LC Unknown
Greater Papuan pipistrelle	A. collinus (Thomas, 1920)	Island of New Guinea	Size: 3–6 cm (1–2 in), plus 3–5 cm (1–2 in) tail 3–4 cm (1–2 in) forearm length Habitat: Forest	LC Unknown
Himalayan pipistrelle	A. babu (Thomas, 1915)	Southern Asia	Size: 4–6 cm (2 in), plus 2–4 cm (1–2 in) tail 2–4 cm (1–2 in) forearm length Habitat: Caves and forest	NE Unknown
Indian pipistrelle	A. coromandra (J. E. Gray, 1838)	Southern and southeastern Asia	Size: 3–5 cm (1–2 in), plus 2–4 cm (1–2 in) tail 2–4 cm (1–2 in) forearm length Habitat: Forest and caves	LC Unknown
Japanese house bat	A. abramus (Temminck, 1840)	Eastern Asia	Size: 3–6 cm (1–2 in), plus 2–5 cm (1–2 in) tail 2–4 cm (1–2 in) forearm length Habitat: Forest, grassland, inland wetlands, and intertidal marine	LC Unknown
Java pipistrelle	A. javanicus (J. E. Gray, 1838) Four subspecies: P. j. camortae; P. j. javanicus; P. j. meyeni; P. j. peguensis	Southern and southeastern Asia	Size: 4–6 cm (2 in), plus 2–4 cm (1–2 in) tail 2–4 cm (1–2 in) forearm length Habitat: Caves and forest	LC Unknown
Kelaart's pipistrelle	A. ceylonicus (Kelaart, 1852) Seven subspecies: P. c. borneanus; P. c. ceylonicus; P. c. indicus; P. c. raptor; P. c. shanorum; P. c. subcanus; P. c. tongfangensis	Southern and southeastern Asia	Size: 4–7 cm (2–3 in), plus 3–5 cm (1–2 in) tail 3–5 cm (1–2 in) forearm length Habitat: Forest and caves	LC Unknown
Least pipistrelle	A. tenuis (Temminck, 1840) Seven subspecies: A. t. mimus; A. t. nitidus; A. t. ponceleti; A. t. portensis; A. t. sewelanus; A. t. subulidens; A. t. tenuis	Southern and southeastern Asia	Size: 3–5 cm (1–2 in), plus 2–4 cm (1–2 in) tail 2–4 cm (1–2 in) forearm length Habitat: Forest, shrubland, and grassland	LC Unknown
Lesser Papuan pipistrelle	A. papuanus (Peters & Doria, 1881)	Indonesia and Papua New Guinea	Size: 3–5 cm (1–2 in), plus 2–4 cm (1–2 in) tail 2–4 cm (1–2 in) forearm length Habitat: Forest	LC Unknown
Minahassa pipistrelle	A. minahassae (von Meyer, 1899)	Indonesia	Size: About 6 cm (2 in), plus about 4 cm (2 in) tail about 4 cm (2 in) forearm length Habitat: Unknown	DD Unknown
Mount Popa pipistrelle	A. paterculus (Thomas, 1915) Two subspecies: P. p. paterculus; P. p. yunnanensis	Southern and southeastern Asia	Size: 4–5 cm (2 in), plus 3–4 cm (1–2 in) tail 2–4 cm (1–2 in) forearm length Habitat: Forest	LC Unknown
Narrow-winged pipistrelle	A. stenopterus (Dobson, 1875)	Southeastern Asia	Size: 5–7 cm (2–3 in), plus 3–6 cm (1–2 in) tail 3–5 cm (1–2 in) forearm length Habitat: Forest, shrubland, grassland, and inland wetlands	LC Unknown
Northern pipistrelle	A. westralis (Koopman, 1984)	Northern Australia	Size: 3–5 cm (1–2 in), plus 2–4 cm (1–2 in) tail 2–4 cm (1–2 in) forearm length Habitat: Forest	LC Unknown
Sturdee's pipistrelle†	A. sturdeei (Thomas, 1915)	Japan	Size: Unknown length Habitat: Unknown	EX 0
Watts's pipistrelle	A. wattsi (Kitchener, Caputi, & Jones, 1986)	Papua New Guinea	Size: 3–5 cm (1–2 in), plus 1–3 cm (0.4–1.2 in) tail 2–4 cm (1–2 in) forearm length Habitat: Forest	LC Unknown

Genus Antrozous – H. Allen, 1862 – two species
Common name	Scientific name and subspecies	Range	Size and ecology	IUCN status and estimated population
Pallid bat	A. pallidus (LeConte, 1856)	Western North America and Cuba	Size: 5–9 cm (2–4 in), plus 3–6 cm (1–2 in) tail 3–5 cm (1–2 in) forearm length Habitat: Forest, rocky areas, and caves	LC Unknown
Koopman's pallid bat	A. koopmani Orr & Silva Taboada, 1960	Cuba	Size: 5–9 cm (2–4 in), plus 3–6 cm (1–2 in) tail 3–5 cm (1–2 in) forearm length Habitat: Forest, rocky areas, and caves	LC Unknown

Genus Arielulus – Hill & Harrison, 1987 – six species
Common name	Scientific name and subspecies	Range	Size and ecology	IUCN status and estimated population
Bronze sprite	A. circumdatus (Temminck, 1840)	Southeastern Asia	Size: 4–6 cm (2 in), plus 3–5 cm (1–2 in) tail 3–5 cm (1–2 in) forearm length Habitat: Forest	LC Unknown
Coppery sprite	A. cuprosus Hill & Francis, 1984	Malaysia	Size: About 6 cm (2 in), plus 3–5 cm (1–2 in) tail 3–4 cm (1–2 in) forearm length Habitat: Forest	VU Unknown
Collared sprite	A. aureocollaris Kock & Storch, 1996	Laos and Thailand	Size: 6–7 cm (2–3 in), plus 4–6 cm (2 in) tail 4–6 cm (2 in) forearm length Habitat: Forest	LC Unknown
Dulong sprite	A. drungicus (Wang, 1982)	Southern and eastern Asia	Size: 4–6 cm (2 in), plus 3–5 cm (1–2 in) tail 3–5 cm (1–2 in) forearm length Habitat: Forest	NE Unknown
Necklace sprite	A. torquatus (Csorba & Lee, 1999)	Taiwan	Size: 4–7 cm (2–3 in), plus 3–5 cm (1–2 in) tail 4–5 cm (2 in) forearm length Habitat: Forest and inland wetlands	LC Unknown
Social sprite	A. societatis Hill, 1972	Malay Peninsula	Size: 4–5 cm (2 in), plus 3–4 cm (1–2 in) tail 3–5 cm (1–2 in) forearm length Habitat: Forest	LC Unknown

Genus Baeodon – Miller, 1906 – two species
Common name	Scientific name and subspecies	Range	Size and ecology	IUCN status and estimated population
Allen's yellow bat	B. alleni Thomas, 1892	Southern Mexico	Size: 4–5 cm (2 in), plus 3–5 cm (1–2 in) tail 3–4 cm (1–2 in) forearm length Habitat: Forest	LC Unknown
Slender yellow bat	B. gracilis Miller, 1897	Southern Mexico	Size: 4–5 cm (2 in), plus 3–5 cm (1–2 in) tail about 3 cm (1 in) forearm length Habitat: Forest	LC Unknown

Genus Barbastella – J. E. Gray, 1821 – six species
Common name	Scientific name and subspecies	Range	Size and ecology	IUCN status and estimated population
Arabian barbastelle	B. leucomelas (Cretzschmar, 1826)	Egypt and western Asia	Size: About 5 cm (2 in), plus 1–2 cm (0.4–0.8 in) tail 3–5 cm (1–2 in) forearm length Habitat: Forest, shrubland, rocky areas, and caves	LC Unknown
Beijing barbastelle	B. beijingensis Zhang, Han, Jones, Lin, Zhang, Zhu, Huang, & Zhang, 2007	China	Size: 5–6 cm (2 in), plus 3–5 cm (1–2 in) tail 4–5 cm (2 in) forearm length Habitat: Forest and caves	DD Unknown
Caspian barbastelle	B. caspica Satunin, 1908	Western Asia	Size: 4–7 cm (2–3 in), plus 4–6 cm (2 in) tail 4–5 cm (2 in) forearm length Habitat: Forest, shrubland, rocky areas, and caves	LC Unknown
Eastern barbastelle	B. darjelingensis (Hodgson, 1855)	Southern and eastern Asia	Size: 4–6 cm (2 in), plus 4–5 cm (2 in) tail 3–5 cm (1–2 in) forearm length Habitat: Forest and caves	LC Unknown
Japanese barbastelle	B. pacifica Kruskop, Kawai, & Tiunov, 2019	Japan	Size: 4–7 cm (2–3 in), plus 4–6 cm (2 in) tail 3–5 cm (1–2 in) forearm length Habitat: Forest and caves	NE Unknown
Western barbastelle	B. barbastellus (Schreber, 1774)	Europe, northern Africa, and western Asia	Size: 4–6 cm (2 in), plus 3–6 cm (1–2 in) tail 3–5 cm (1–2 in) forearm length Habitat: Forest, shrubland, rocky areas, and caves	NT Unknown

Genus Bauerus – Van Gelder, 1959 – one species
Common name	Scientific name and subspecies	Range	Size and ecology	IUCN status and estimated population
Van Gelder's bat	B. dubiaquercus Van Gelder, 1959	Southern Mexico and Central America	Size: 5–8 cm (2–3 in), plus 4–6 cm (2 in) tail 5–6 cm (2 in) forearm length Habitat: Forest	NT Unknown

Genus Cassistrellus – Ruedi, Eger, Lim, & Csorba, 2017 – two species
Common name	Scientific name and subspecies	Range	Size and ecology	IUCN status and estimated population
Surat helmeted bat	C. dimissus (Thomas, 1916)	Scattered southeastern Asia	Size: 5–7 cm (2–3 in), plus 4–5 cm (2 in) tail 3–5 cm (1–2 in) forearm length Habitat: Unknown	DD Unknown
Yok Don helmeted bat	C. yokdonensis Ruedi, Eger, Lim, & Csorba, 2017	Cambodia and Vietnam	Size: 6–7 cm (2–3 in), plus 4–6 cm (2 in) tail 4–5 cm (2 in) forearm length Habitat: Unknown	NE Unknown

Genus Chalinolobus – Peters, 1866 – eight species
Common name	Scientific name and subspecies	Range	Size and ecology	IUCN status and estimated population
Chocolate wattled bat	C. morio (J. E. Gray, 1841)	Australia	Size: 4–7 cm (2–3 in), plus 3–5 cm (1–2 in) tail 3–5 cm (1–2 in) forearm length Habitat: Forest, savanna, shrubland, grassland, and caves	LC Unknown
Coastal lobe-lipped bat	C. orarius (Parnaby, King, Hamilton, & Eldridge, 2024)	Papua New Guinea	Size: 4–6 cm (2 in), plus 2–5 cm (1–2 in) tail 3–4 cm (1–2 in) forearm length Habitat: Forest, savanna, and shrubland	NE Unknown
Gould's wattled bat	C. gouldii (G. R. Gray, 1841)	Australia	Size: 4–8 cm (2–3 in), plus 4–5 cm (2 in) tail 3–5 cm (1–2 in) forearm length Habitat: Forest, savanna, and shrubland	LC Unknown
Hoary wattled bat	C. nigrogriseus Gould, 1852	Northern Australia	Size: 4–6 cm (2 in), plus 2–5 cm (1–2 in) tail 3–4 cm (1–2 in) forearm length Habitat: Forest, savanna, and shrubland	LC Unknown
Large-eared pied bat	C. dwyeri Ryan, 1966	Eastern Australia	Size: 4–6 cm (2 in), plus 3–5 cm (1–2 in) tail 3–5 cm (1–2 in) forearm length Habitat: Forest, savanna, and caves	VU Unknown
Little pied bat	C. picatus Gould, 1852	Eastern Australia	Size: 4–5 cm (2 in), plus 2–4 cm (1–2 in) tail 3–4 cm (1–2 in) forearm length Habitat: Forest, savanna, and shrubland	NT Unknown
New Caledonian wattled bat	C. neocaledonicus Revilliod, 1914	New Caledonia	Size: About 5 cm (2 in), plus 3–5 cm (1–2 in) tail 3–4 cm (1–2 in) forearm length Habitat: Shrubland	EN 1,500–2,000
New Zealand long-tailed bat	C. tuberculatus (Forster, 1844)	New Zealand	Size: 4–7 cm (2–3 in), plus 3–5 cm (1–2 in) tail 3–5 cm (1–2 in) forearm length Habitat: Forest and shrubland	CR Unknown

Genus Cnephaeus – Kaup, 1829 – fifteen species
Common name	Scientific name and subspecies	Range	Size and ecology	IUCN status and estimated population
Anatolian serotine	C. anatolicus (Felten, 1971)	Western Asia and Egypt	Size: 6–8 cm (2–3 in), plus 4–6 cm (2 in) tail 4–5 cm (2 in) forearm length Habitat: Forest and shrubland	LC Unknown
Botta's serotine	C. bottae (Peters, 1869) Five subspecies: E. b. bottae; E. b. hingstoni; E. b. innesi; E. b. omanensis; E. b. taftanimontis	Western Asia and Egypt	Size: 5–7 cm (2–3 in), plus 4–6 cm (2 in) tail 3–5 cm (1–2 in) forearm length Habitat: Shrubland, rocky areas, and desert	LC Unknown
Gobi big brown bat	C. gobiensis (Bóbrinski, 1926) Three subspecies: C. g. centrasiaticus; C. g. gobiensis; C. g. kashgaricus	Central Asia	Size: 4–7 cm (2–3 in), plus 3–6 cm (1–2 in) tail 3–5 cm (1–2 in) forearm length Habitat: Shrubland, grassland, and desert	LC Unknown
Horn-skinned bat	C. floweri (De Winton, 1901)	North-central Africa	Size: 4–5 cm (2 in), plus 3–4 cm (1–2 in) tail 3–4 cm (1–2 in) forearm length Habitat: Desert, grassland, and shrubland	LC Unknown
Japanese short-tailed bat	C. japonensis (Imaizumi, 1953)	Japan	Size: 5–7 cm (2–3 in), plus 3–5 cm (1–2 in) tail 3–5 cm (1–2 in) forearm length Habitat: Forest	VU Unknown
Kobayashi's bat	C. kobayashii (Mori, 1928)	Korea	Size: 5–7 cm (2–3 in), plus 4–6 cm (2 in) tail 3–5 cm (1–2 in) forearm length Habitat: Unknown	DD Unknown
Lagos serotine	C. platyops (Thomas, 1901)	Nigeria	Size: 6–8 cm (2–3 in), plus 4–5 cm (2 in) tail 4–6 cm (2 in) forearm length Habitat: Unknown	DD Unknown
Long-tailed house bat	C. hottentotus (Smith, 1833) Three subspecies: E. h. bensoni; E. h. hottentotus; E. h. portavernus	Southern Africa	Size: 6–8 cm (2–3 in), plus 3–6 cm (1–2 in) tail 3–6 cm (1–2 in) forearm length Habitat: Rocky areas, inland wetlands, grassland, shrubland, savanna, and forest	LC Unknown
Meridional serotine	C. isabellinus (Temminck, 1840)	Northwestern Africa and Spain	Size: 6–8 cm (2–3 in), plus 4–6 cm (2 in) tail 4–6 cm (2 in) forearm length Habitat: Forest, shrubland, and grassland	LC Unknown
Northern bat	C. nilssonii (Keyserling & Blasius, 1839) Two subspecies: E. n. nilssonii; E. n. parvus	Europe and northern Asia	Size: 5–7 cm (2–3 in), plus 3–5 cm (1–2 in) tail 3–5 cm (1–2 in) forearm length Habitat: Forest, inland wetlands, caves, and desert	LC Unknown
Ognev's serotine	C. ognevi (Bóbrinski, 1918)	West-central Asia	Size: 6–7 cm (2–3 in), plus 4–6 cm (2 in) tail 4–5 cm (2 in) forearm length Habitat: Shrubland, rocky areas, and desert	LC Unknown
Oriental serotine	C. pachyomus (Tomes, 1857)	Western and Eastern Asia	Size: 7–8 cm (3 in), plus 5–6 cm (2 in) tail 4–6 cm (2 in) forearm length Habitat: Forest, shrubland, and caves	LC Unknown
Serotine bat	C. serotinus (Schreber, 1774) Nine subspecies: E. s. andersoni; E. s. boscai; E. s. horikawai; E. s. isabellinus; E. s. pallens; E. s. pashtonus; E. s. serotinus; E. s. shirazensis; E. s. turcomanus	Europe and Asia	Size: 6–9 cm (2–4 in), plus 3–7 cm (1–3 in) tail 4–6 cm (2 in) forearm length Habitat: Forest, savanna, shrubland, grassland, inland wetlands, rocky areas, and caves	LC Unknown
Sombre bat	C. tatei (Ellerman & Morrison-Scott, 1951)	India	Size: About 5 cm (2 in), plus about 5 cm (2 in) tail about 4 cm (2 in) forearm length Habitat: Forest	DD Unknown
Thick-eared bat	C. pachyotis (Dobson, 1871)	Eastern Asia	Size: 5–6 cm (2 in), plus 4–5 cm (2 in) tail 3–5 cm (1–2 in) forearm length Habitat: Forest	LC Unknown

Genus Corynorhinus – H. Allen, 1865 – four species
Common name	Scientific name and subspecies	Range	Size and ecology	IUCN status and estimated population
Leon Paniagua's big-eared bat	C. leonpaniaguae López-Cuamatzi, Ortega, Ospina-Garcés, Zúñiga, & MacSwiney, 2024	Mexico	Size: 4–6 cm (2 in), plus 4–6 cm (2 in) tail 3–5 cm (1–2 in) forearm length Habitat: Forest and caves	NE Unknown
Mexican big-eared bat	C. mexicanus G. M. Allen, 1916	Mexico	Size: 4–6 cm (2 in), plus 4–6 cm (2 in) tail 3–5 cm (1–2 in) forearm length Habitat: Forest and caves	NT Unknown
Rafinesque's big-eared bat	C. rafinesquii Lesson, 1827	Eastern United States	Size: 3–6 cm (1–2 in), plus 4–6 cm (2 in) tail 3–5 cm (1–2 in) forearm length Habitat: Forest and caves	LC Unknown
Townsend's big-eared bat	C. townsendii Cooper, 1837	Western and eastern North America	Size: 5–6 cm (2 in), plus 3–6 cm (1–2 in) tail 3–5 cm (1–2 in) forearm length Habitat: Caves, shrubland, and forest	LC Unknown

Genus Eptesicus – Rafinesque, 1820 – two species
Common name	Scientific name and subspecies	Range	Size and ecology	IUCN status and estimated population
Big brown bat	E. fuscus (Palisot de Beauvois, 1796) Eleven subspecies: E. f. bahamensis; E. f. bernardinus; E. f. fuscus; E. f. hispaniolae; E. f. lynni; E. f. miradorensis; E. f. osceola; E. f. pallidus; E. f. peninsulae; E. f. petersoni; E. f. wetmorei	North America and northern South America	Size: 5–9 cm (2–4 in), plus 3–6 cm (1–2 in) tail 3–6 cm (1–2 in) forearm length Habitat: Forest, rocky areas, and caves	LC Unknown
Caribbean brown bat	E. dutertreus (Gervais, 1837)	Caribbean	Size: 5–9 cm (2–4 in), plus 3–6 cm (1–2 in) tail 3–6 cm (1–2 in) forearm length Habitat: Forest, rocky areas, and caves	NE Unknown

Genus Euderma – H. Allen, 1892 – one species
Common name	Scientific name and subspecies	Range	Size and ecology	IUCN status and estimated population
Spotted bat	E. maculatum (J. A. Allen, 1891)	Western North America	Size: 6–7 cm (2–3 in), plus 4–5 cm (2 in) tail 4–6 cm (2 in) forearm length Habitat: Forest, caves, and desert	LC Unknown

Genus Falsistrellus – Troughton, 1943 – two species
Common name	Scientific name and subspecies	Range	Size and ecology	IUCN status and estimated population
Eastern false pipistrelle	F. tasmaniensis (Gould, 1858)	Eastern Australia	Size: 5–7 cm (2–3 in), plus 4–6 cm (2 in) tail 4–6 cm (2 in) forearm length Habitat: Forest	VU Unknown
Western false pipistrelle	F. mackenziei Kitchener, Caputi, & Jones, 1986	Western Australia	Size: 5–7 cm (2–3 in), plus 4–6 cm (2 in) tail 4–6 cm (2 in) forearm length Habitat: Forest	NT Unknown

Genus Glauconycteris – Dobson, 1875 – fifteen species
Common name	Scientific name and subspecies	Range	Size and ecology	IUCN status and estimated population
Abo bat	G. poensis (J. E. Gray, 1842)	Western and central Africa	Size: 4–6 cm (2 in), plus 3–5 cm (1–2 in) tail 3–5 cm (1–2 in) forearm length Habitat: Forest	LC Unknown
Allen's spotted bat	G. humeralis Allen, 1917	Central Africa	Size: 3–5 cm (1–2 in), plus 3–6 cm (1–2 in) tail 3–5 cm (1–2 in) forearm length Habitat: Forest	DD Unknown
Allen's striped bat	G. alboguttata Allen, 1917	Central Africa	Size: 5–6 cm (2 in), plus 4–5 cm (2 in) tail 3–5 cm (1–2 in) forearm length Habitat: Forest	LC Unknown
Baka butterfly bat	G. baka Gomeh-Djame, Bates, Juste, Suarez-Rubio, Torrent, García-Mudarra, Agodigo Ayangma, Yettore, Bilong Bilong, & Bakwo-Fils, 2026	Cameroon and Democratic Republic of the Congo	Size: 3–5 cm (1–2 in), plus 3–6 cm (1–2 in) tail 3–5 cm (1–2 in) forearm length Habitat: Forest	NE Unknown
Beatrix's bat	G. beatrix Thomas, 1901	Western and central Africa	Size: 3–5 cm (1–2 in), plus 3–6 cm (1–2 in) tail 3–5 cm (1–2 in) forearm length Habitat: Forest	LC Unknown
Bibundi bat	G. egeria Thomas, 1913	Central Africa	Size: 4–5 cm (2 in), plus 3–5 cm (1–2 in) tail 3–4 cm (1–2 in) forearm length Habitat: Forest and unknown	DD Unknown
Black butterfly bat	G. atra Hassanin, Colombo, Tungaluna, Merle, Tu, Görföl, Akawa, Csorba, Kearney, Monadjem, Ing, 2018	Democratic Republic of the Congo	Size: 4–6 cm (2 in), plus 3–5 cm (1–2 in) tail 3–4 cm (1–2 in) forearm length Habitat: Forest	NE Unknown
Curry's bat	G. curryae Eger & Schlitter, 2001	Central Africa	Size: 4–5 cm (2 in), plus 3–5 cm (1–2 in) tail 3–4 cm (1–2 in) forearm length Habitat: Forest	DD Unknown
Glen's wattled bat	G. gleni Peterson & Smith, 1973	Central Africa	Size: 5–6 cm (2 in), plus 4–5 cm (2 in) tail 3–5 cm (1–2 in) forearm length Habitat: Forest	DD Unknown
Kenyan wattled bat	G. kenyacola Peterson, 1982	Kenya	Size: About 5 cm (2 in), plus about 5 cm (2 in) tail about 4 cm (2 in) forearm length Habitat: Unknown	DD Unknown
Lobéké butterfly bat	G. lobeke Gomeh-Djame, Bates, Juste, Suarez-Rubio, Torrent, García-Mudarra, Agodigo Ayangma, Yettore, Bilong Bilong, & Bakwo-Fils, 2026	Central Africa	Size: 3–5 cm (1–2 in), plus 3–6 cm (1–2 in) tail 3–5 cm (1–2 in) forearm length Habitat: Forest	NE Unknown
Machado's butterfly bat	G. machadoi Hayman, 1963	Angola	Size: About 6 cm (2 in), plus about 5 cm (2 in) tail about 5 cm (2 in) forearm length Habitat: Forest	DD Unknown
Pied butterfly bat	G. superba Hayman, 1939	Western and central Africa	Size: 4–7 cm (2–3 in), plus 3–5 cm (1–2 in) tail 4–5 cm (2 in) forearm length Habitat: Forest	LC Unknown
Silvered bat	G. argentata (Dobson, 1875)	Central Africa	Size: 5–7 cm (2–3 in), plus 4–6 cm (2 in) tail 3–5 cm (1–2 in) forearm length Habitat: Forest and savanna	LC Unknown
Variegated butterfly bat	G. variegata (Tomes, 1875)	Sub-Saharan Africa	Size: 4–7 cm (2–3 in), plus 4–6 cm (2 in) tail 3–5 cm (1–2 in) forearm length Habitat: Shrubland, savanna, and forest	LC Unknown

Genus Glischropus – Dobson, 1875 – five species
Common name	Scientific name and subspecies	Range	Size and ecology	IUCN status and estimated population
Common thick-thumbed bat	G. tylopus (Dobson, 1875) Two subspecies: G. t. batjanus; G. t. tylopus	Southeastern Asia	Size: About 4 cm (2 in), plus 3–4 cm (1–2 in) tail 2–4 cm (1–2 in) forearm length Habitat: Forest	LC Unknown
Dark thick-thumbed bat	G. aquilus Csorba, Görföl, Wiantoro, Kingston, Bates, & Huang, 2015	Indonesia	Size: About 4 cm (2 in), plus about 4 cm (2 in) tail about 3 cm (1 in) forearm length Habitat: Forest	NE Unknown
Indochinese thick-thumbed bat	G. bucephalus Csorba, 2011	Southeastern Asia	Size: 4–5 cm (2 in), plus 3–5 cm (1–2 in) tail 3–4 cm (1–2 in) forearm length Habitat: Forest	LC Unknown
Javan thick-thumbed bat	G. javanus Chasen, 1939	Indonesia	Size: About 4 cm (2 in), plus about 4 cm (2 in) tail about 3 cm (1 in) forearm length Habitat: Forest	DD Unknown
Meghalaya thick-thumbed bat	G. meghalayanus Saikia, Ruedi, & Csorba, 2022	India	Size: 4–5 cm (2 in), plus 3–5 cm (1–2 in) tail 3–4 cm (1–2 in) forearm length Habitat: Forest	NE Unknown

Genus Hesperoptenus – Peters, 1868 – five species
Common name	Scientific name and subspecies	Range	Size and ecology	IUCN status and estimated population
Blanford's bat	H. blanfordi Dobson, 1877	Southeastern Asia	Size: 3–5 cm (1–2 in), plus 3–4 cm (1–2 in) tail 2–3 cm (1 in) forearm length Habitat: Forest and caves	LC Unknown
False serotine bat	H. doriae (Peters, 1868)	Malaysia	Size: About 5 cm (2 in), plus about 4 cm (2 in) tail 3–5 cm (1–2 in) forearm length Habitat: Forest	DD Unknown
Gaskell's false serotine	H. gaskelli Hill, 1983	Indonesia	Size: Unknown length about 4 cm (2 in) forearm length Habitat: Forest	DD Unknown
Large false serotine	H. tomesi Thomas, 1905	Southeastern Asia	Size: About 7 cm (3 in), plus 4–6 cm (2 in) tail 5–6 cm (2 in) forearm length Habitat: Forest	VU Unknown
Tickell's bat	H. tickelli Blyth, 1851	Southern and southeastern Asia	Size: 6–8 cm (2–3 in), plus 4–7 cm (2–3 in) tail 4–6 cm (2 in) forearm length Habitat: Forest and caves	LC Unknown

Genus Histiotus – Gervais, 1856 – eleven species
Common name	Scientific name and subspecies	Range	Size and ecology	IUCN status and estimated population
Big-eared brown bat	H. macrotus (Poeppig, 1835)	Southern South America	Size: 5–7 cm (2–3 in), plus 4–7 cm (2–3 in) tail 4–6 cm (2 in) forearm length Habitat: Caves	LC Unknown
Cadena's big-eared brown bat	H. cadenai (Rodríguez-Posada, Ramírez-Chaves, & Morales-Martínez, 2021)	Colombia	Size: 6–7 cm (2–3 in), plus 4–5 cm (2 in) tail 4–5 cm (2 in) forearm length Habitat: Forest and caves	NE Unknown
Colombian big-eared brown bat	H. colombiae Thomas, 1916	Northwestern South America	Size: Unknown length about 5 cm (2 in) forearm length Habitat: Forest and caves	NE Unknown
Transparent-winged big-eared brown bat	H. diaphanopterus Thomas, 1916	Northwestern South America	Size: Unknown length 5 cm (2 in) forearm length Habitat: Forest and caves	NE Unknown
Humboldt big-eared brown bat	H. humboldti Handley, 1996	Northern South America	Size: 5–6 cm (2 in), plus 4–6 cm (2 in) tail 4–5 cm (2 in) forearm length Habitat: Forest	DD Unknown
Moche's big-eared brown bat	H. mochica Velazco, Almeida, Cláudio, Giménez, & Giannini, 1916	Peru	Size: 5–6 cm (2 in) tail, plus 5–6 cm (2 in) tail 4–5 cm (2 in) forearm length Habitat: Forest and caves	NE Unknown
Small big-eared brown bat	H. montanus Philippi & Landbeck, 1861	Western and southern South America	Size: 5–7 cm (2–3 in), plus 4–6 cm (2 in) tail 4–6 cm (2 in) forearm length Habitat: Forest and caves	LC Unknown
Southern big-eared brown bat	H. magellanicus Philippi, 1866	Southern South America	Size: 5–7 cm (2–3 in), plus 4–7 cm (2–3 in) tail 4–5 cm (2 in) forearm length Habitat: Forest	LC Unknown
Strange big-eared brown bat	H. alienus Thomas, 1916	Southern South America	Size: About 5 cm (2 in), plus about 5 cm (2 in) tail about 5 cm (2 in) forearm length Habitat: Unknown	DD Unknown
Thomas's big-eared brown bat	H. laephotis Thomas, 1916	Central South America	Size: 5–7 cm (2–3 in), plus 4–6 cm (2 in) tail 4–5 cm (2 in) forearm length Habitat: Forest	LC Unknown
Tropical big-eared brown bat	H. velatus Geoffroy, 1824	Central and western South America	Size: 5–8 cm (2–3 in), plus 4–6 cm (2 in) tail 4–5 cm (2 in) forearm length Habitat: Forest	DD Unknown

Genus Hypsugo – Kolenati, 1856 – sixteen species
Common name	Scientific name and subspecies	Range	Size and ecology	IUCN status and estimated population
Alashanian pipistrelle	H. alaschanicus Bóbrinski, 1926	Eastern Asia	Size: 3–5 cm (1–2 in), plus 3–4 cm (1–2 in) tail 3–4 cm (1–2 in) forearm length Habitat: Forest and caves	LC Unknown
Arabian pipistrelle	H. arabicus Harrison, 1979	Southwestern Asia	Size: 3–5 cm (1–2 in), plus 3–5 cm (1–2 in) tail 2–4 cm (1–2 in) forearm length Habitat: Shrubland, inland wetlands, and desert	DD Unknown
Big-eared pipistrelle	H. macrotis (Temminck, 1840)	Southeastern Asia	Size: About 5 cm (2 in), plus about 4 cm (2 in) tail 3–4 cm (1–2 in) forearm length Habitat: Forest and inland wetlands	DD Unknown
Brown pipistrelle	H. imbricatus (Horsfield, 1824)	Southeastern Asia	Size: 4–5 cm (2 in), plus 3–5 cm (1–2 in) tail 3–4 cm (1–2 in) forearm length Habitat: Forest and inland wetlands	LC Unknown
Burma pipistrelle	H. lophurus (Thomas, 1915)	Myanmar	Size: About 6 cm (2 in), plus about 4 cm (2 in) tail about 4 cm (2 in) forearm length Habitat: Forest and grassland	DD Unknown
Cadorna's pipistrelle	H. cadornae (Thomas, 1916)	Southeastern Asia	Size: 4–6 cm (2 in), plus 3–5 cm (1–2 in) tail 3–4 cm (1–2 in) forearm length Habitat: Forest and caves	LC Unknown
Chinese pipistrelle	H. pulveratus (Peters, 1870)	Eastern and southeastern Asia	Size: 3–5 cm (1–2 in), plus 3–4 cm (1–2 in) tail 3–4 cm (1–2 in) forearm length Habitat: Forest, rocky areas, and caves	LC Unknown
Chocolate pipistrelle	H. affinis Dobson, 1871	Southern and southeastern Asia	Size: 4–6 cm (2 in), plus 3–5 cm (1–2 in) tail 3–5 cm (1–2 in) forearm length Habitat: Forest	LC Unknown
Desert pipistrelle	H. ariel (Thomas, 1904)	Arabian Peninsula and northeastern Africa	Size: 3–5 cm (1–2 in), plus 3–5 cm (1–2 in) tail 2–4 cm (1–2 in) forearm length Habitat: Shrubland, rocky areas, and desert	DD Unknown
Long-toothed pipistrelle	H. dolichodon Görföl, Csorba, Eger, & Francis, 2014	Southeastern Asia	Size: Unknown length 3–4 cm (1–2 in) forearm length Habitat: Forest and caves	DD Unknown
Peters's pipistrelle	H. petersi (Meyer, 1899)	Southeastern Asia	Size: 4–6 cm (2 in), plus about 3–4 cm (1–2 in) tail 3–5 cm (1–2 in) forearm length Habitat: Forest	DD Unknown
Pungent pipistrelle	H. mordax (Peters, 1866)	Indonesia	Size: 4–6 cm (2 in), plus about 3–5 cm (1–2 in) tail 3–4 cm (1–2 in) forearm length Habitat: Unknown	DD Unknown
Red-brown pipistrelle	H. kitcheneri (Thomas, 1915)	Indonesia	Size: About 6 cm (2 in), plus about 4 cm (2 in) tail 3–4 cm (1–2 in) forearm length Habitat: Forest	DD Unknown
Savi's pipistrelle	H. savii Bonaparte, 1837	Europe, northern Africa, and western Asia	Size: 4–6 cm (2 in), plus 3–5 cm (1–2 in) tail 3–4 cm (1–2 in) forearm length Habitat: Forest, shrubland, grassland, inland wetlands, rocky areas, and desert	LC Unknown
Socotran pipistrelle	H. lanzai Benda, Al-Jumaily, Reiter, & Nasher, 2011	Socotra island in Yemen	Size: About 5 cm (2 in), plus about 4 cm (2 in) tail 3–4 cm (1–2 in) forearm length Habitat: Savanna and shrubland	EN Unknown
Vordermann's pipistrelle	H. vordermanni Jentink, 1890	Southeastern Asia	Size: About 5 cm (2 in), plus 1–2 cm (0.4–0.8 in) tail 3–4 cm (1–2 in) forearm length Habitat: Forest	DD Unknown

Genus Ia – Thomas, 1902 – one species
Common name	Scientific name and subspecies	Range	Size and ecology	IUCN status and estimated population
Great evening bat	I. io Thomas, 1902	Eastern Asia	Size: 8–11 cm (3–4 in), plus 4–9 cm (2–4 in) tail 6–9 cm (2–4 in) forearm length Habitat: Forest and caves	NT Unknown

Genus Idionycteris – Anthony, 1923 – one species
Common name	Scientific name and subspecies	Range	Size and ecology	IUCN status and estimated population
Allen's big-eared bat	I. phyllotis G. M. Allen, 1916	Western United States and Mexico	Size: About 7 cm (3 in), plus 4–6 cm (2 in) tail 4–5 cm (2 in) forearm length Habitat: Forest, caves, and desert	LC Unknown

Genus Laephotis – Thomas, 1901 – nine species
Common name	Scientific name and subspecies	Range	Size and ecology	IUCN status and estimated population
Angolan long-eared bat	L. angolensis Monard, 1935	Central Africa	Size: 4–5 cm (2 in), plus 3–4 cm (1–2 in) tail 3–4 cm (1–2 in) forearm length Habitat: Savanna	DD Unknown
Cape serotine	L. capensis (A. Smith, 1829)	Sub-Saharan Africa	Size: 4–8 cm (2–3 in), plus 2–4 cm (1–2 in) tail 2–4 cm (1–2 in) forearm length Habitat: Forest, savanna, shrubland, and grassland	LC Unknown
De Winton's long-eared bat	L. wintoni Thomas, 1901	Eastern Africa	Size: 5–7 cm (2–3 in), plus 3–5 cm (1–2 in) tail 3–5 cm (1–2 in) forearm length Habitat: Savanna, shrubland, and grassland	LC Unknown
East African serotine	L. kirinyaga (Monadjem, Patterson, Webala, & Demos, 2020)	Eastern and western Africa	Size: 4–6 cm (2 in), plus 2–4 cm (1–2 in) tail 3–4 cm (1–2 in) forearm length Habitat: Savanna, shrubland, and grassland	LC Unknown
Isalo serotine	L. malagasyensis (Peterson, Eger, & Mitchell, 1995)	Madagascar	Size: Unknown length, plus about 3 cm (1 in) tail 3–4 cm (1–2 in) forearm length Habitat: Forest	VU Unknown
Malagasy serotine	L. matroka (Thomas & Schwann, 1905)	Madagascar	Size: 4–6 cm (2 in), plus 2–4 cm (1–2 in) tail 2–4 cm (1–2 in) forearm length Habitat: Forest	LC Unknown
Namib long-eared bat	L. namibensis Setzer, 1971	Southern Africa	Size: 4–7 cm (2–3 in), plus 3–5 cm (1–2 in) tail 3–5 cm (1–2 in) forearm length Habitat: Savanna and desert	LC Unknown
Roberts's serotine	L. robertsi Goodman, Taylor, Ratrimomanarivo, & Hoofer, 2012	Madagascar	Size: 5–6 cm (2 in), plus 3–4 cm (1–2 in) tail 3–4 cm (1–2 in) forearm length Habitat: Inland wetlands	DD Unknown
Stanley's serotine	L. stanleyi (Goodman, Kearney, Ratsimbazafy, & Hassanin, 2012)	Southern Africa	Size: 4–6 cm (2 in), plus 3–5 cm (1–2 in) tail 3–4 cm (1–2 in) forearm length Habitat: Forest, savanna, shrubland, and grassland	NE Unknown

Genus Lasionycteris – Peters, 1866 – one species
Common name	Scientific name and subspecies	Range	Size and ecology	IUCN status and estimated population
Silver-haired bat	L. noctivagans (Conte, 1831)	North America	Size: 5–7 cm (2–3 in), plus 3–5 cm (1–2 in) tail 3–5 cm (1–2 in) forearm length Habitat: Forest, rocky areas, and caves	LC Unknown

Genus Lasiurus – J. E. Gray, 1831 – twenty species
Common name	Scientific name and subspecies	Range	Size and ecology	IUCN status and estimated population
Arequipa cinnamon red bat	L. arequipae Málaga, Díaz, Arias, & Medina, 2020	Peru	Size: 5–6 cm (2 in) tail, plus 5–7 cm (2–3 in); 4–5 cm (2 in) tail forearm length Habitat: Forest	NE Unknown
Big red bat	L. egregius (Peters, 1870)	Eastern South America	Size: 5–7 cm (2–3 in), plus 4–6 cm (2 in) tail 4–5 cm (2 in) forearm length Habitat: Forest	DD Unknown
Cinnamon red bat	L. varius (Poeppig, 1835)	Southern South America	Size: 5–7 cm (2–3 in), plus 4–6 cm (2 in) tail 3–5 cm (1–2 in) forearm length Habitat: Forest	LC Unknown
Cuban yellow bat	L. insularis (Hall & Jones, 1961)	Cuba	Size: 8–9 cm (3–4 in), plus 6–9 cm (2–4 in) tail 5–7 cm (2–3 in) forearm length Habitat: Forest	VU Unknown
Eastern red bat	L. borealis O. F. Müller, 1776	North America	Size: 5–6 cm (2 in), plus 4–7 cm (2–3 in) tail 3–5 cm (1–2 in) forearm length Habitat: Forest	LC Unknown
Greater red bat	L. atratus Handley, 1996	Northern South America	Size: About 6 cm (2 in), plus 5–6 cm (2 in) tail 4–5 cm (2 in) forearm length Habitat: Forest	LC Unknown
Hairy hoary bat	L. villosissimus (E. Geoffroy, 1806)	South America	Size: About 8 cm (3 in), plus 3–6 cm (1–2 in) tail 5–6 cm (2 in) forearm length Habitat: Forest and caves	NE Unknown
Hairy-tailed bat	L. ebenus Fazzolari-Corrêa, 1994	Brazil	Size: 5–7 cm (2–3 in), plus 5–6 cm (2 in) tail about 5 cm (2 in) forearm length Habitat: Forest	DD Unknown
Hawaiian hoary bat	L. semotus (H. Allen, 1890)	Hawai'i	Size: About 5 cm (2 in), plus about 5 cm (2 in) tail about 4 cm (2 in) forearm length Habitat: Forest and caves	NE Unknown
Hoary bat	L. cinereus (Palisot de Beauvois, 1796)	North America and South America	Size: 8–9 cm (3–4 in), plus 4–7 cm (2–3 in) tail 5–6 cm (2 in) forearm length Habitat: Forest and caves	LC Unknown
Jamaican red bat	L. degelidus Miller, 1931	Jamaica	Size: 5–6 cm (2 in), plus 5–6 cm (2 in) tail 4–5 cm (2 in) forearm length Habitat: Forest	VU Unknown
Minor red bat	L. minor Miller, 1931	Caribbean	Size: 4–7 cm (2–3 in), plus 3–5 cm (1–2 in) tail 3–5 cm (1–2 in) forearm length Habitat: Forest	VU Unknown
Northern yellow bat	L. intermedius (H. Allen, 1862) Two subspecies: L. i. floridanus; L. i. intermedius	Southern North America and Central America	Size: About 8 cm (3 in), plus 5–7 cm (2–3 in) tail 4–6 cm (2 in) forearm length Habitat: Forest	LC Unknown
Pfeiffer's red bat	L. pfeifferi Gundlach, 1861	Cuba	Size: 5–6 cm (2 in), plus 4–5 cm (2 in) tail 4–5 cm (2 in) forearm length Habitat: Unknown	NT Unknown
Seminole bat	L. seminolus (Rhoads, 1895)	Southeastern United States	Size: 4–8 cm (2–3 in), plus 3–5 cm (1–2 in) tail 3–5 cm (1–2 in) forearm length Habitat: Forest	LC Unknown
Southern red bat	L. blossevillii (Lesson & Garnot, 1826) Three subspecies: L. b. blossevillii; L. b. brachyotis; L. b. teliotis	South America (in red)	Size: 4–7 cm (2–3 in), plus 3–6 cm (1–2 in) tail 3–5 cm (1–2 in) forearm length Habitat: Forest and savanna	LC Unknown
Southern yellow bat	L. ega Gervais, 1856 Five subspecies: L. e. argentinus; L. e. caudatus; L. e. ega; L. e. fuscatus; L. e. panamensis	Mexico, Central America, and South America	Size: 5–8 cm (2–3 in), plus 4–7 cm (2–3 in) tail 4–6 cm (2 in) forearm length Habitat: Forest	LC Unknown
Tacarcuna bat	L. castaneus Handley, 1960	Central America	Size: 5–6 cm (2 in), plus 4–5 cm (2 in) tail 4–5 cm (2 in) forearm length Habitat: Forest	DD Unknown
Western red bat	L. frantzii (Peters, 1871)	North America and Central America (green and yellow)	Size: 4–7 cm (2–3 in), plus 4–6 cm (2 in) tail 3–5 cm (1–2 in) forearm length Habitat: Forest and savanna	NE Unknown
Western yellow bat	L. xanthinus Thomas, 1897	Southern North America	Size: 6–8 cm (2–3 in), plus 4–5 cm (2 in) tail 4–5 cm (2 in) forearm length Habitat: Forest and savanna	LC Unknown

Genus Mimetillus – Thomas, 1904 – one species
Common name	Scientific name and subspecies	Range	Size and ecology	IUCN status and estimated population
Moloney's mimic bat	M. moloneyi (Thomas, 1891)	Sub-Saharan Africa	Size: 5–7 cm (2–3 in), plus 2–4 cm (1–2 in) tail 2–4 cm (1–2 in) forearm length Habitat: Forest and savanna	LC Unknown

Genus Mirostrellus – Görföl, Kruskop, Tu, Estók, Son, & Csorba, 2020 – one species
Common name	Scientific name and subspecies	Range	Size and ecology	IUCN status and estimated population
Joffre's bat	M. joffrei (Thomas, 1915)	Myanmar	Size: About 6 cm (2 in), plus 3–5 cm (1–2 in) tail 3–4 cm (1–2 in) forearm length Habitat: Forest	DD Unknown

Genus Neoeptesicus – Cláudio, Novaes, Gardner, Nogueira, Wilson, Maldonado, Oliveira, & Moratelli, 2023 – ten species
Common name	Scientific name and subspecies	Range	Size and ecology	IUCN status and estimated population
Argentine brown bat	N. furinalis (d'Orbigny & Gervais, 1847)	Mexico, Central America, and South America	Size: 4–7 cm (2–3 in), plus 3–5 cm (1–2 in) tail 3–5 cm (1–2 in) forearm length Habitat: Forest	LC Unknown
Brazilian brown bat	N. brasiliensis (Desmarest, 1819) Four subspecies: E. b. argentinus; E. b. brasiliensis; E. b. melanopterus; E. b. thomasi	Southern Mexico, Central America, and South America	Size: 5–7 cm (2–3 in), plus 3–5 cm (1–2 in) tail 3–5 cm (1–2 in) forearm length Habitat: Forest	LC Unknown
Chiriquinan serotine	N. chiriquinus (Thomas, 1920)	Central America and northern South America	Size: 6–7 cm (2–3 in), plus 3–6 cm (1–2 in) tail 4–5 cm (2 in) forearm length Habitat: Forest	LC Unknown
Diminutive serotine	N. diminutus (Osgood, 1915) Two subspecies: E. d. diminutus; E. d. fidelis	Northern and southeastern South America	Size: About 5 cm (2 in), plus about 4 cm (2 in) tail about 4 cm (2 in) forearm length Habitat: Forest	LC Unknown
Harmless serotine	N. innoxius (Gervais, 1841)	Western South America	Size: 4–6 cm (2 in), plus 3–5 cm (1–2 in) tail 3–4 cm (1–2 in) forearm length Habitat: Forest	NT Unknown
Langer's serotine	N. langeri (Acosta, Poma-Urey, Ossa-López, Rivera-Páez, & Ramírez-Chaves, 2021)	Bolivia	Size: 5–6 cm (2 in), plus 3–5 cm (1–2 in) tail 4–5 cm (2 in) forearm length Habitat: Forest	NE Unknown
Little black serotine	N. andinus (Allen, 1914)	Northern and central South America	Size: 5–7 cm (2–3 in), plus 3–4 cm (1–2 in) tail 3–5 cm (1–2 in) forearm length Habitat: Unknown	LC Unknown
Orinoco serotine	N. orinocensis (Ramírez-Chaves, Morales-Martínez, Pérez, Velásquez-Guarín, Mejía-Fontecha, Ortíz-Giraldo, Ossa-López, & Rivera-Páez, 2021)	Northern South America	Size: Unknown length Habitat: Forest	NE Unknown
Taddei's serotine	N. taddeii Miranda, Bernardi, & Passos, 2006	Southern Brazil	Size: 5–7 cm (2–3 in), plus 4–6 cm (2 in) tail 4–5 cm (2 in) forearm length Habitat: Forest	DD Unknown
Ulapes serotine	N. ulapesensis (Sánchez, Montani, Tomasco, Díaz, & Barquez, 2019)	Argentina	Size: 5–7 cm (2–3 in), plus 3–5 cm (1–2 in) tail 4–5 cm (2 in) forearm length Habitat: Forest	NE Unknown

Genus Neoromicia – Roberts, 1926 – six species
Common name	Scientific name and subspecies	Range	Size and ecology	IUCN status and estimated population
Anchieta's serotine	N. anchietae (Seabra, 1900)	Southern Africa	Size: 4–5 cm (2 in), plus 3–4 cm (1–2 in) tail 2–4 cm (1–2 in) forearm length Habitat: Inland wetlands and forest	LC Unknown
Lowveld serotine	N. hlandzeni Taylor, Strydom, Richards, Markotter, Toussaint, Kearney, Cotterill, Howard, Weier, Keith, Neef, Mamba, Magagula, & Monadjem, 2022	Southern Africa	Size: 4–5 cm (2 in), plus 2–4 cm (1–2 in) tail 2–4 cm (1–2 in) forearm length Habitat: Forest, savanna, and desert	NE Unknown
Kirindy serotine	N. bemainty (Goodman, Rakotondramanana, Ramasindrazana, Kearney, Monadjem, Schoeman, Taylor, Naughton, & Appleton, 2015)	Madagascar	Size: 4–5 cm (2 in), plus 3–4 cm (1–2 in) tail 2–4 cm (1–2 in) forearm length Habitat: Inland wetlands and forest	LC Unknown
Somali serotine	N. somalica (Thomas, 1901)	Sub-Saharan Africa	Size: 3–6 cm (1–2 in), plus 2–4 cm (1–2 in) tail 2–4 cm (1–2 in) forearm length Habitat: Forest and savanna	LC Unknown
Tiny serotine	N. guineensis (Bocage, 1889)	Sub-Saharan Africa	Size: 3–4 cm (1–2 in), plus 2–4 cm (1–2 in) tail 2–4 cm (1–2 in) forearm length Habitat: Savanna and shrubland	LC Unknown
Zulu serotine	N. zuluensis (Roberts, 1924)	Southern and eastern Africa	Size: 4–5 cm (2 in), plus 2–4 cm (1–2 in) tail 2–4 cm (1–2 in) forearm length Habitat: Forest, savanna, and desert	LC Unknown

Genus Nyctalus – Bowdich, 1825 – eight species
Common name	Scientific name and subspecies	Range	Size and ecology	IUCN status and estimated population
Azores noctule	N. azoreum Thomas, 1901	Azores islands	Size: 5–6 cm (2 in), plus 4–5 cm (2 in) tail 3–5 cm (1–2 in) forearm length Habitat: Forest and inland wetlands	VU 2,000–5,000
Birdlike noctule	N. aviator Thomas, 1911	Eastern Asia	Size: 8–11 cm (3–4 in), plus 4–7 cm (2–3 in) tail 5–7 cm (2–3 in) forearm length Habitat: Forest	NT Unknown
Chinese noctule	N. plancyi Gerbe, 1880 Two subspecies: N. p. plancyi; N. p. velutinus	Eastern Asia	Size: 6–9 cm (2–4 in), plus 3–6 cm (1–2 in) tail 4–5 cm (2 in) forearm length Habitat: Forest, rocky areas, and caves	LC Unknown
Common noctule	N. noctula (Schreber, 1774) Four subspecies: N. n. labiata; N. n. lebanoticus; N. n. mecklenburzevi; N. n. noctula	Europe and Asia	Size: 6–9 cm (2–4 in), plus 4–7 cm (2–3 in) tail 4–6 cm (2 in) forearm length Habitat: Caves, inland wetlands, and forest	LC Unknown
Greater noctule bat	N. lasiopterus (Schreber, 1780)	Europe, northern Africa, and western Asia	Size: 8–11 cm (3–4 in), plus 4–8 cm (2–3 in) tail 5–7 cm (2–3 in) forearm length Habitat: Forest and shrubland Diet: Insects and birds	VU 0–10,000
Japanese noctule	N. furvus Imaizumi & Yoshiyuki, 1968	Japan	Size: 7–9 cm (3–4 in), plus 4–6 cm (2 in) tail 4–6 cm (2 in) forearm length Habitat: Forest	EN Unknown
Lesser noctule	N. leisleri (Kuhl, 1817) Two subspecies: N. l. leisleri; N. l. verrucosus	Europe, northern Africa, and western and central Asia	Size: 4–8 cm (2–3 in), plus 3–5 cm (1–2 in) tail 3–5 cm (1–2 in) forearm length Habitat: Forest, shrubland, and rocky areas	LC Unknown
Mountain noctule	N. montanus Barrett-Hamilton, 1906	Central Asia	Size: 6–7 cm (2–3 in), plus about 4 cm (2 in) tail 4–5 cm (2 in) forearm length Habitat: Forest, rocky areas, and caves	LC Unknown

Genus Nycticeinops – Hill & Harrison, 1987 – three species
Common name	Scientific name and subspecies	Range	Size and ecology	IUCN status and estimated population
Eisentraut's serotine	N. eisentrauti (Hill, 1968)	Cameroon	Size: Unknown length, plus 2–4 cm (1–2 in) tail 3–4 cm (1–2 in) forearm length Habitat: Forest	DD Unknown
Big-headed serotine	N. macrocephalus (Hutterer & Kerbis Peterhans, 2019)	Democratic Republic of the Congo	Size: 5 cm (2 in), plus 4 cm (2 in) tail 3–4 cm (1–2 in) forearm length Habitat: Forest	NE Unknown
Schlieffen's serotine	N. schlieffeni (Peters, 1869)	Africa	Size: 3–5 cm (1–2 in), plus 2–4 cm (1–2 in) tail 2–4 cm (1–2 in) forearm length Habitat: Savanna, shrubland, and desert	LC Unknown

Genus Nycticeius – Rafinesque, 1819 – three species
Common name	Scientific name and subspecies	Range	Size and ecology	IUCN status and estimated population
Cuban evening bat	N. cubanus Gundlach, 1861	Western Cuba	Size: About 5 cm (2 in), plus 2–4 cm (1–2 in) tail 2–4 cm (1–2 in) forearm length Habitat: Unknown	NT Unknown
Evening bat	N. humeralis (Rafinesque, 1818) Three subspecies: N. h. humeralis; N. h. mexicanus; N. h. subtropicalis	Southern North America	Size: About 6 cm (2 in), plus 3–5 cm (1–2 in) tail 3–4 cm (1–2 in) forearm length Habitat: Forest	LC Unknown
Temminck's mysterious bat	N. aenobarbus Temminck, 1840	South America	Size: About 4 cm (2 in), plus about 2 cm (1 in) tail about 3 cm (1 in) forearm length Habitat:	DD Unknown

Genus Nyctophilus – Leach, 1821 – seventeen species
Common name	Scientific name and subspecies	Range	Size and ecology	IUCN status and estimated population
Arnhem long-eared bat	N. arnhemensis Johnson, 1959	Northern Australia	Size: 4–6 cm (2 in), plus 3–5 cm (1–2 in) tail 3–4 cm (1–2 in) forearm length Habitat: Forest and savanna	LC Unknown
Eastern long-eared bat	N. bifax Thomas, 1915 Two subspecies: N. b. bifax; N. b. daedalus	Eastern Australia and Papua New Guinea	Size: 3–6 cm (1–2 in), plus 3–5 cm (1–2 in) tail 3–5 cm (1–2 in) forearm length Habitat: Forest and inland wetlands	LC Unknown
Gould's long-eared bat	N. gouldi Tomes, 1858	Eastern and western Australia	Size: 4–6 cm (2 in), plus 3–5 cm (1–2 in) tail 3–5 cm (1–2 in) forearm length Habitat: Forest	LC Unknown
Greater long-eared bat	N. timoriensis Geoffroy, 1806 Three subspecies: N. t. major; N. t. sherrini; N. t. timoriensis	Southeastern Asia	Size: 5–8 cm (2–3 in), plus 3–6 cm (1–2 in) tail 3–5 cm (1–2 in) forearm length Habitat: Forest	NE Unknown
Holts' long-eared bat	N. holtorum Parnaby, King, & Eldridge, 2021	Western Australia	Size: Unknown length, plus about 5 cm (2 in) tail about 4 cm (2 in) forearm length Habitat: Forest	LC Unknown
Lesser long-eared bat	N. geoffroyi Leach, 1821 Three subspecies: N. g. geoffroyi; N. g. pacificus; N. g. pallescens	Australia	Size: 3–5 cm (1–2 in), plus 3–4 cm (1–2 in) tail 3–5 cm (1–2 in) forearm length Habitat: Forest, savanna, shrubland, and grassland	LC Unknown
Lord Howe long-eared bat†	N. howensis McKean, 1975	Lord Howe Island in Australia	Size: Unknown length Habitat: Unknown	EX 0
Mount Missim long-eared bat	N. shirleyae Parnaby, 2009	Papua New Guinea	Size: 5–7 cm (2–3 in), plus 4–6 cm (2 in) tail 4–5 cm (2 in) forearm length Habitat: Forest	DD Unknown
New Caledonian long-eared bat	N. nebulosus Parnaby, 2002.	New Caledonia	Size: 5–6 cm (2 in), plus 4–5 cm (2 in) tail 4–5 cm (2 in) forearm length Habitat: Forest	CR 150–250
New Guinea long-eared bat	N. microtis Thomas, 1888	Papua New Guinea	Size: 4–7 cm (2–3 in), plus 3–5 cm (1–2 in) tail 3–5 cm (1–2 in) forearm length Habitat: Forest and caves	LC Unknown
Pallid long-eared bat	N. daedalus Thomas, 1915	Northern Australia	Size: 4–6 cm (2 in), plus 4–5 cm (2 in) tail 3–5 cm (1–2 in) forearm length Habitat: Forest and inland wetlands	LC 10,000
Pygmy long-eared bat	N. walkeri Thomas, 1892	Northern Australia	Size: 3–5 cm (1–2 in), plus 2–4 cm (1–2 in) tail 3–4 cm (1–2 in) forearm length Habitat: Forest and savanna	LC Unknown
Small-toothed long-eared bat	N. microdon Laurie & Hill, 1954	Papua New Guinea	Size: 4–7 cm (2–3 in), plus 3–5 cm (1–2 in) tail 3–5 cm (1–2 in) forearm length Habitat: Caves	LC Unknown
Southeastern long-eared bat	N. corbeni Parnaby, 2009	Australia	Size: 5–8 cm (2–3 in), plus 3–6 cm (1–2 in) tail 3–5 cm (1–2 in) forearm length Habitat: Forest	VU Unknown
Sunda long-eared bat	N. heran Kitchener, How, & Maharadatunkamsi, 1991	Indonesia	Size: About 5 cm (2 in), plus about 4 cm (2 in) tail about 4 cm (2 in) forearm length Habitat: Forest	DD Unknown
Tasmanian long-eared bat	N. sherrini Thomas, 1915	Tasmania	Size: 5–6 cm (2 in), plus 3–4 cm (1–2 in) tail 4–5 cm (2 in) forearm length Habitat: Forest	VU 8,000–10,000
Western long-eared bat	N. major J. E. Gray, 1844	Southwestern Australia	Size: 5–7 cm (2–3 in), plus 4–6 cm (2 in) tail 3–5 cm (1–2 in) forearm length Habitat: Forest	LC 10,000

Genus Otonycteris – Peters, 1859 – two species
Common name	Scientific name and subspecies	Range	Size and ecology	IUCN status and estimated population
Desert long-eared bat	O. hemprichii Peters, 1859	Northern Africa and western Asia	Size: 5–9 cm (2–4 in), plus 4–7 cm (2–3 in) tail 5–7 cm (2–3 in) forearm length Habitat: Shrubland, rocky areas, and desert	LC Unknown
Turkestani long-eared bat	O. leucophaea (N. A. Severcov, 1873)	Western Asia	Size: 7–8 cm (3 in), plus 4–7 cm (2–3 in) tail 5–7 cm (2–3 in) forearm length Habitat: Desert and grassland	DD Unknown

Genus Parastrellus – Hoofer, Van Den Bussche, & Horáček, 2006 – one species
Common name	Scientific name and subspecies	Range	Size and ecology	IUCN status and estimated population
Canyon bat	P. hesperus (H. Allen, 1864)	Western United States and Mexico (in red)	Size: 3–6 cm (1–2 in), plus 2–4 cm (1–2 in) tail 2–4 cm (1–2 in) forearm length Habitat: Forest, grassland, rocky areas, caves, and desert	LC Unknown

Genus Perimyotis – Menu, 1984 – one species
Common name	Scientific name and subspecies	Range	Size and ecology	IUCN status and estimated population
Tricolored bat	P. subflavus (F. Cuvier, 1832) Four subspecies: P. s. clarus; P. s. floridanus; P. s. subflavus; P. s. veraecrucis	Eastern North America (in yellow)	Size: 4–5 cm (2 in), plus 3–5 cm (1–2 in) tail 3–4 cm (1–2 in) forearm length Habitat: Forest, rocky areas, and caves	VU Unknown

Genus Pharotis – Thomas, 1914 – one species
Common name	Scientific name and subspecies	Range	Size and ecology	IUCN status and estimated population
New Guinea big-eared bat	P. imogene Thomas, 1914	Papua New Guinea	Size: 4–5 cm (2 in), plus 4–5 cm (2 in) tail 3–4 cm (1–2 in) forearm length Habitat: Forest	CR 40–50

Genus Philetor – Thomas, 1902 – one species
Common name	Scientific name and subspecies	Range	Size and ecology	IUCN status and estimated population
Rohu's bat	P. brachypterus Temminck, 1840	Southeastern Asia	Size: 5–7 cm (2–3 in), plus 3–4 cm (1–2 in) tail 3–4 cm (1–2 in) forearm length Habitat: Forest and grassland	LC Unknown

Genus Pipistrellus – Kaup, 1829 – sixteen species
Common name	Scientific name and subspecies	Range	Size and ecology	IUCN status and estimated population
Aellen's pipistrelle	P. inexspectatus Aellen, 1959	Western Africa	Size: About 5 cm (2 in), plus 3–4 cm (1–2 in) tail 3–4 cm (1–2 in) forearm length Habitat: Forest and savanna	DD Unknown
Bioko pipistrelle	P. etula Torrent, Juste, Garin, Aihartza, Dalton, Mamba, Tanshi, Powell, Padidar, García-Mudarra, Richards, & Monadjem, 2025	Equatorial Guinea	Size: Unknown length Habitat: Forest and savanna	NE Unknown
Common pipistrelle	P. pipistrellus (Schreber, 1774) Two subspecies: P. p. aladdin; P. p. pipistrellus	Europe, northern Africa, and Asia	Size: 3–6 cm (1–2 in), plus 2–4 cm (1–2 in) tail 2–4 cm (1–2 in) forearm length Habitat: Forest, shrubland, inland wetlands, and caves	LC Unknown
Crete pipistrelle	P. creticus Benda, 2008	Crete	Size: 3–5 cm (1–2 in), plus 3–4 cm (1–2 in) tail 2–3 cm (1–1 in) forearm length Habitat: Forest, shrubland, inland wetlands, and rocky areas	NE Unknown
Dar es Salaam pipistrelle	P. permixtus Aellen, 1957	Tanzania	Size: About 4 cm (2 in), plus about 3 cm (1 in) tail about 3 cm (1 in) forearm length Habitat: Forest	DD Unknown
Dusky pipistrelle	P. hesperidus (Temminck, 1840) Three subspecies: P. h. fuscatus; P. h. hesperidus; P. h. subtilis	Madagascar	Size: 4–6 cm (2 in), plus 2–5 cm (1–2 in) tail 2–4 cm (1–2 in) forearm length Habitat: Forest and savanna	LC Unknown
Hanak's pipistrelle	P. hanaki Hulva & Benda, 2004	Crete and Libya	Size: 4–5 cm (2 in), plus 3–4 cm (1–2 in) tail 3–4 cm (1–2 in) forearm length Habitat: Forest, shrubland, inland wetlands, and rocky areas	VU Unknown
Kuhl's pipistrelle	P. kuhlii Kuhl, 1817 Three subspecies: P. k. ikhwanius; P. k. kuhlii; P. k. lepidus	Europe, western Asia, northern Africa, and Madagascar	Size: 4–6 cm (2 in), plus 3–5 cm (1–2 in) tail 3–4 cm (1–2 in) forearm length Habitat: Forest, shrubland, and grassland	LC Unknown
Madeira pipistrelle	P. maderensis Dobson, 1878	Azores, Madeira Island and the Canary Islands	Size: 3–5 cm (1–2 in), plus 3–4 cm (1–2 in) tail 2–4 cm (1–2 in) forearm length Habitat: Forest and inland wetlands	EN 2,000–2,500
Mount Gargues pipistrelle	P. aero Heller, 1912	Kenya and Ethiopia	Size: 4–5 cm (2 in), plus 3–4 cm (1–2 in) tail 3–4 cm (1–2 in) forearm length Habitat: Forest	DD Unknown
Nathusius's pipistrelle	P. nathusii (Keyserling & Blasius, 1839)	Europe	Size: 4–6 cm (2 in), plus 3–4 cm (1–2 in) tail 3–4 cm (1–2 in) forearm length Habitat: Forest and inland wetlands	LC Unknown
Racey's pipistrelle	P. raceyi Bates, Ratrimomanarivo, Harrison, & Goodman, 2006	Madagascar	Size: 4–6 cm (2 in), plus 2–4 cm (1–2 in) tail 2–4 cm (1–2 in) forearm length Habitat: Forest	DD Unknown
Rusty pipistrelle	P. rusticus (Tomes, 1861) Two subspecies: P. r. marrensis; P. r. rusticus	Sub-Saharan Africa	Size: 4–5 cm (2 in), plus 1–4 cm (0.4–1.6 in) tail 2–4 cm (1–2 in) forearm length Habitat: Forest and savanna	LC Unknown
Simandou pipistrelle	P. simandouensis Monadjem, Richards, Decher, & Hutterer, 2020	Guinea and Liberia	Size: 4–6 cm (2 in), plus 2–4 cm (1–2 in) tail 3–4 cm (1–2 in) forearm length Habitat: Forest and savanna	NE Unknown
Soprano pipistrelle	P. pygmaeus (Leach, 1825)	Europe	Size: 3–6 cm (1–2 in), plus 2–4 cm (1–2 in) tail 2–4 cm (1–2 in) forearm length Habitat: Forest and inland wetlands	LC Unknown
Tiny pipistrelle	P. nanulus Thomas, 1904	Western and central Africa	Size: 3–5 cm (1–2 in), plus 2–4 cm (1–2 in) tail 2–4 cm (1–2 in) forearm length Habitat: Forest and savanna	LC Unknown

Genus Plecotus – Geoffroy, 1818 – eighteen species
Common name	Scientific name and subspecies	Range	Size and ecology	IUCN status and estimated population
Alpine long-eared bat	P. macrobullaris Kuzyakin, 1965	Central Europe	Size: 4–6 cm (2 in), plus 4–6 cm (2 in) tail 3–5 cm (1–2 in) forearm length Habitat: Caves, grassland, shrubland, and forest	LC Unknown
Brown long-eared bat	P. auritus (Linnaeus, 1758)	Europe and western Asia	Size: 3–5 cm (1–2 in), plus 3–5 cm (1–2 in) tail 3–5 cm (1–2 in) forearm length Habitat: Forest and caves	LC Unknown
Canary long-eared bat	P. teneriffae Barrett-Hamilton, 1907	Canary Islands	Size: 4–6 cm (2 in), plus 4–6 cm (2 in) tail 4–5 cm (2 in) forearm length Habitat: Forest and caves	CR 500–2,000
Christie's long-eared bat	P. christii J. E. Gray, 1838	Northern Africa and western Asia	Size: 4–6 cm (2 in), plus 4–5 cm (2 in) tail 3–5 cm (1–2 in) forearm length Habitat: Shrubland, rocky areas, and desert	DD Unknown
Ethiopian long-eared bat	P. balensis Kruskop & Lavrenchenko, 2000	Ethiopia	Size: 4–5 cm (2 in), plus 4–6 cm (2 in) tail 3–5 cm (1–2 in) forearm length Habitat: Forest	DD Unknown
Gaisler's long-eared bat	P. gaisleri Benda, Kiefer, Hanák, & Veith, 2004	Northern Africa and Italy	Size: 4–6 cm (2 in), plus 4–6 cm (2 in) tail 3–5 cm (1–2 in) forearm length Habitat: Shrubland, rocky areas, and desert	NE Unknown
Gobi long-eared bat	P. gobiensis Dolch, Stubbe, Gärtner, Thiele, Ariunbold, Batsaikhan, Lkhagvasuren, Stubbe, & Steinhauser, 2021	Mongolia	Size: 4–7 cm (2–3 in), plus 3–7 cm (1–3 in) tail 4–7 cm (2–3 in) forearm length Habitat: Forest	NE Unknown
Grey long-eared bat	P. austriacus (J. B. Fischer, 1829)	Europe	Size: 4–6 cm (2 in), plus 3–6 cm (1–2 in) tail 3–5 cm (1–2 in) forearm length Habitat: Forest, shrubland, grassland, and caves	NT Unknown
Himalayan long-eared bat	P. homochrous Hodgson, 1847	Southern and eastern Asia	Size: 4–5 cm (2 in), plus 4–5 cm (2 in) tail 3–5 cm (1–2 in) forearm length Habitat: Forest	DD Unknown
Japanese long-eared bat	P. sacrimontis Allen, 1908	Japan	Size: 4–6 cm (2 in), plus 4–6 cm (2 in) tail 3–5 cm (1–2 in) forearm length Habitat: Forest and caves	LC Unknown
Kozlov's long-eared bat	P. kozlovi Bóbrinski, 1926	Eastern Asia	Size: Unknown length, plus 4–6 cm (2 in) tail 4–5 cm (2 in) forearm length Habitat: Savanna, rocky areas, and desert	LC Unknown
Mediterranean long-eared bat	P. kolombatovici Đulić, 1980	Southern Europe and western Asia	Size: 4–5 cm (2 in), plus 4–5 cm (2 in) tail 3–4 cm (1–2 in) forearm length Habitat: Forest, shrubland, grassland, and caves	LC 8,000–10,000
Ognev's long-eared bat	P. ognevi Kishida, 1927	Eastern Asia	Size: 4–5 cm (2 in), plus 4–5 cm (2 in) tail 4–5 cm (2 in) forearm length Habitat: Forest, caves, grassland, and shrubland	LC Unknown
Sardinian long-eared bat	P. sardus Mucedda, Kiefer, Pidinchedda, & Veith, 2002	Sardinia island in Italy	Size: About 5 cm (2 in), plus about 5 cm (2 in) tail 4–5 cm (2 in) forearm length Habitat: Forest and caves	CR 150
Strelkov's long-eared bat	P. strelkovi Spitzenberger, 2006	Central Asia	Size: 4–6 cm (2 in), plus 4–6 cm (2 in) tail 4–5 cm (2 in) forearm length Habitat: Forest	LC Unknown
Taiwan long-eared bat	P. taivanus Yoshiyuki, 1991	Taiwan	Size: 4–5 cm (2 in), plus 4–5 cm (2 in) tail 3–4 cm (1–2 in) forearm length Habitat: Forest	NT Unknown
Turkmen long-eared bat	P. turkmenicus Strelkov, 1988	Western Asia	Size: About 6 cm (2 in), plus about 5 cm (2 in) tail about 5 cm (2 in) forearm length Habitat: Desert	LC Unknown
Ward's long-eared bat	P. wardi Thomas, 1911	South Asia	Size: 4–6 cm (2 in), plus 4–6 cm (2 in) tail 4–5 cm (2 in) forearm length Habitat: Forest, shrubland, and caves	LC Unknown

Genus Pseudoromicia – Monadjem, Patterson, Webala & Demos, 2020 – nine species
Common name	Scientific name and subspecies	Range	Size and ecology	IUCN status and estimated population
Dark-brown serotine	P. brunnea (Thomas, 1880)	Western Africa	Size: 4–5 cm (2 in), plus 3–5 cm (1–2 in) tail 3–4 cm (1–2 in) forearm length Habitat: Forest	NT Unknown
Isabelline white-winged serotine	P. isabella (Decher, Hutterer, & Monadjem, 2015)	Liberia	Size: 4–5 cm (2 in), plus 2–4 cm (1–2 in) tail 2–4 cm (1–2 in) forearm length Habitat: Forest	DD Unknown
Kityo's serotine	P. kityoi Monadjem, Kerbis Peterhans, Nalikka, Waswa, Demos, & Patterson, 2020	Uganda	Size: 5–6 cm (2 in), plus 3–4 cm (1–2 in) tail 3–4 cm (1–2 in) forearm length Habitat: Forest	EN Unknown
Mbam Minkom serotine	P. mbamminkom Grunwald, Demos, Nguéagni, Tchamba, Monadjem, Webala, Kerbis Peterhans, Patterson, & Ruedas, 2023	Cameroon	Size: 3–5 cm (1–2 in), plus 2–4 cm (1–2 in) tail 2–4 cm (1–2 in) forearm length Habitat: Forest and savanna	NE Unknown
Nyanza serotine	P. nyanza Monadjem, Patterson, Webala, & Demos, 2020	Kenya	Size: 4–6 cm (2 in), plus 3–4 cm (1–2 in) tail 2–4 cm (1–2 in) forearm length Habitat: Forest and savanna	NE Unknown
Príncipe's serotine	P. principis Juste, Torrent, Méndez-Rodríguez, Howard, García-Mudarra, Nogueras, & Ibáñez, 2023	São Tomé and Príncipe	Size: Unknown length Habitat: Forest and savanna	NE Unknown
Rendall's serotine	P. rendalli (Thomas, 1889)	Sub-Saharan Africa	Size: 3–7 cm (1–3 in), plus 3–5 cm (1–2 in) tail 2–4 cm (1–2 in) forearm length Habitat: Savanna and shrubland	LC Unknown
Rosevear's serotine	P. roseveari (Monadjem, Richards, Taylor, & Stoffberg, 2013)	Western Africa	Size: 4–5 cm (2 in), plus 3–5 cm (1–2 in) tail about 4 cm (2 in) forearm length Habitat: Forest	EN Unknown
White-winged serotine	P. tenuipinnis (Peters, 1872)	Sub-Saharan Africa	Size: 3–5 cm (1–2 in), plus 2–4 cm (1–2 in) tail 2–4 cm (1–2 in) forearm length Habitat: Forest and savanna	LC Unknown

Genus Rhogeessa – H. Allen, 1866 – twelve species
Common name	Scientific name and subspecies	Range	Size and ecology	IUCN status and estimated population
Bickham's little yellow bat	R. bickhami Baird, Marchán-Rivadeneira, Pérez, & Baker, 2012	Central America	Size: 4–5 cm (2 in), plus 2–4 cm (1–2 in) tail 2–3 cm (1 in) forearm length Habitat: Forest	LC Unknown
Black-winged little yellow bat	R. tumida H. Allen, 1866	Mexico and Central America	Size: 3–5 cm (1–2 in), plus 2–4 cm (1–2 in) tail 2–4 cm (1–2 in) forearm length Habitat: Forest	LC Unknown
Ecuadorian little yellow bat	R. velilla Thomas, 1903	Peru and Ecuador	Size: 3–5 cm (1–2 in), plus 2–4 cm (1–2 in) tail 2–4 cm (1–2 in) forearm length Habitat: Forest	DD Unknown
Genoways's yellow bat	R. genowaysi Baker, 1984	Southern Mexico	Size: 3–5 cm (1–2 in), plus 2–4 cm (1–2 in) tail 2–3 cm (1 in) forearm length Habitat: Forest	EN Unknown
Husson's yellow bat	R. hussoni Genoways & Baker, 1996	Eastern South America	Size: Unknown length about 3 cm (1 in) forearm length Habitat: Forest	DD Unknown
Least yellow bat	R. mira LaVal, 1973	Southern Mexico	Size: 3–4 cm (1–2 in), plus 2–4 cm (1–2 in) tail 2–3 cm (1 in) forearm length Habitat: Forest	VU Unknown
Little yellow bat	R. parvula H. Allen, 1866	Western Mexico	Size: 4–5 cm (2 in), plus 2–4 cm (1–2 in) tail 2–3 cm (1 in) forearm length Habitat: Forest	LC Unknown
Menchu's little yellow bat	R. menchuae Baird, Marchán-Rivadeneira, Pérez, & Baker, 2012	Central America	Size: 4–5 cm (2 in), plus 2–4 cm (1–2 in) tail 2–3 cm (1 in) forearm length Habitat: Forest	DD Unknown
Nicaraguan little yellow bat	R. permutandis Baird, Light, & Bickham, 2019	Nicaragua	Size: About 5 cm (2 in), plus about 3 cm (1 in) tail unknown forearm length Habitat: Forest	NE Unknown
Thomas's yellow bat	R. io Thomas, 1903	Central America and South America	Size: 3–5 cm (1–2 in), plus 2–4 cm (1–2 in) tail 2–4 cm (1–2 in) forearm length Habitat: Forest	LC Unknown
Tiny yellow bat	R. minutilla Miller, 1897	Colombia and Venezuela	Size: 4–5 cm (2 in), plus 2–4 cm (1–2 in) tail 2–3 cm (1 in) forearm length Habitat: Forest and shrubland	VU Unknown
Yucatan yellow bat	R. aenea Goodwin, 1958	Southern Mexico and northern Central America	Size: 3–5 cm (1–2 in), plus 2–4 cm (1–2 in) tail 2–4 cm (1–2 in) forearm length Habitat: Forest	LC Unknown

Genus Rhyneptesicus – Bianchi, 1917 – one species
Common name	Scientific name and subspecies	Range	Size and ecology	IUCN status and estimated population
Sind bat	R. nasutus (Dobson, 1877) Four subspecies: E. n. batinensis; E. n. matschiei; E. n. nasutus; E. n. pellucens	Western Asia	Size: 4–6 cm (2 in), plus 3–5 cm (1–2 in) tail 3–4 cm (1–2 in) forearm length Habitat: Forest, savanna, caves, and desert	LC Unknown

Genus Scoteanax – Troughton, 1944 – one species
Common name	Scientific name and subspecies	Range	Size and ecology	IUCN status and estimated population
Rüppell's broad-nosed bat	S. rueppellii (Peters, 1866)	Eastern Australia	Size: 6–8 cm (2–3 in), plus 4–6 cm (2 in) tail 5–6 cm (2 in) forearm length Habitat: Forest	LC Unknown

Genus Scotoecus – Thomas, 1901 – five species
Common name	Scientific name and subspecies	Range	Size and ecology	IUCN status and estimated population
Dark-winged lesser house bat	S. hirundo De Winton, 1899	Sub-Saharan Africa	Size: About 4 cm (2 in), plus tail about 3 cm (1 in) forearm length Habitat: Savanna and forest	LC Unknown
Desert yellow bat	S. pallidus Dobson, 1876	Southern Asia	Size: 4–6 cm (2 in), plus 2–5 cm (1–2 in) tail 3–4 cm (1–2 in) forearm length Habitat: Forest and shrubland	LC Unknown
Hinde's lesser house bat	S. hindei Thomas, 1901 Two subspecies: S. h. falabae; S. h. hindei	Sub-Saharan Africa	Size: Unknown length 3–4 cm (1–2 in) forearm length Habitat: Savanna and forest	LC Unknown
Light-winged lesser house bat	S. albofuscus Thomas, 1890 Two subspecies: S. a. albofuscus; S. a. woodi	Western and southeastern Africa	Size: 4–6 cm (2 in), plus 2–5 cm (1–2 in) tail 2–4 cm (1–2 in) forearm length Habitat: Forest and savanna	DD Unknown
White-bellied lesser house bat	S. albigula Thomas, 1909	Sub-Saharan Africa	Size: About 6 cm (2 in), plus about 3 cm (1 in) tail About 4 cm (2 in) forearm length Habitat: Forest and savanna	LC Unknown

Genus Scotomanes – Dobson, 1875 – one species
Common name	Scientific name and subspecies	Range	Size and ecology	IUCN status and estimated population
Harlequin bat	S. ornatus (Blyth, 1851) Three subspecies: S. o. imbrensis; S. o. ornatus; S. o. sinensis	Eastern and southeastern Asia	Size: 6–9 cm (2–4 in), plus 5–7 cm (2–3 in) tail 5–7 cm (2–3 in) forearm length Habitat: Forest and caves	LC Unknown

Genus Scotophilus – Leach, 1821 – twenty species
Common name	Scientific name and subspecies	Range	Size and ecology	IUCN status and estimated population
African yellow bat	S. dinganii A. Smith, 1833 Three subspecies: S. d. dinganii; S. d. herero; S. d. pondoensis	Sub-Saharan Africa	Size: 7–9 cm (3–4 in), plus 4–7 cm (2–3 in) tail 4–6 cm (2 in) forearm length Habitat: Savanna	LC Unknown
Andrew Rebori's house bat	S. andrewreborii Brooks & Bickham, 2014	Eastern Africa	Size: 7–9 cm (3–4 in), plus 4–5 cm (2 in) tail 4–6 cm (2 in) forearm length Habitat: Forest and savanna	LC Unknown
Eastern greenish yellow bat	S. viridis (Peters, 1852)	Sub-Saharan Africa	Size: 7–9 cm (3–4 in), plus 3–5 cm (1–2 in) tail 4–6 cm (2 in) forearm length Habitat: Savanna	LC Unknown
Ejeta's yellow bat	S. ejetai Brooks & Bickham, 2014	Ethiopia	Size: 7–8 cm (3 in), plus 4–5 cm (2 in) tail 5–6 cm (2 in) forearm length Habitat: Grassland, shrubland, and savanna	LC Unknown
Eritrean yellow bat	S. colias Thomas, 1904	Eastern Africa	Size: Unknown length 5–6 cm (2 in) forearm length Habitat: Savanna	NE Unknown
Greater Asiatic yellow bat	S. heathii Horsfield, 1831 Three subspecies: S. h. heathii; S. h. insularis; S. h. watkinsi	Southern and southeastern Asia	Size: 6–10 cm (2–4 in), plus 4–8 cm (2–3 in) tail 5–7 cm (2–3 in) forearm length Habitat: Forest, shrubland, and desert	LC Unknown
Lesser Asiatic yellow bat	S. kuhlii Leach, 1821 Seven subspecies: S. k. castaneus; S. k. consobrinus; S. k. gairdneri; S. k. kuhlii; S. k. panayensis; S. k. solutatus; S. k. temminckii	Southern and southeastern Asia	Size: 5–9 cm (2–4 in), plus 3–7 cm (1–3 in) tail 4–6 cm (2 in) forearm length Habitat: Forest, shrubland, and desert	LC Unknown
Lesser brown bat	S. altilis G. M. Allen, 1914	Central Africa	Size: Unknown length about 5 cm (2 in) forearm length Habitat: Savanna	NE Unknown
Lesser yellow bat	S. borbonicus Geoffroy, 1803	Madagascar	Size: Unknown length Habitat: Unknown	DD Unknown
Livingstone's yellow bat	S. livingstonii Brooks & Bickham, 2014	Western Africa	Size: 7–9 cm (3–4 in), plus 3–6 cm (1–2 in) tail 5–6 cm (2 in) forearm length Habitat: Grassland, savanna, and forest	LC Unknown
Malagasy yellow bat	S. tandrefana Goodman, Jenkin, & Ratrimomanarivo, 2005	Madagascar	Size: 6–7 cm (2–3 in), plus 4–5 cm (2 in) tail 4–5 cm (2 in) forearm length Habitat: Forest	DD Unknown
Marovaza yellow bat	S. marovaza Goodman, Ratrimomanarivo, & Randrianandrianina, 2006	Madagascar	Size: 6–7 cm (2–3 in), plus 3–5 cm (1–2 in) tail 4–5 cm (2 in) forearm length Habitat: Forest	LC Unknown
Nut-colored yellow bat	S. nux Thomas, 1904	Western and central Africa	Size: 6–9 cm (2–4 in), plus 4–6 cm (2 in) tail 5–7 cm (2–3 in) forearm length Habitat: Forest	LC Unknown
Robbins's yellow bat	S. nucella Robbins, 1984	Western Africa	Size: 7–8 cm (3 in), plus 4–5 cm (2 in) tail 4–6 cm (2 in) forearm length Habitat: Forest	DD Unknown
Robust yellow bat	S. robustus H. Milne-Edwards, 1881	Madagascar	Size: 9–10 cm (4 in), plus 5–7 cm (2–3 in) tail 6–7 cm (2–3 in) forearm length Habitat: Forest	LC Unknown
Schreber's yellow bat	S. nigrita (Schreber, 1774) Two subspecies: S. n. alvenslebeni; S. n. nigrita	Western and eastern Africa	Size: 10–13 cm (4–5 in), plus 6–10 cm (2–4 in) tail 7–9 cm (3–4 in) forearm length Habitat: Forest and savanna	LC Unknown
Sody's yellow bat	S. collinus Sody, 1936	Southeastern Asia	Size: 5–8 cm (2–3 in), plus 2–6 cm (1–2 in) tail 4–6 cm (2 in) forearm length Habitat: Forest	LC Unknown
Trujillo's yellow bat	S. trujilloi Brooks & Bickham, 2014	Kenya	Size: 6–8 cm (2–3 in), plus 3–5 cm (1–2 in) tail 4–5 cm (2 in) forearm length Habitat: Forest	LC Unknown
Western greenish yellow bat	S. viridis de Winton, 1899	Sub-Saharan Africa	Size: 7–9 cm (3–4 in), plus 3–5 cm (1–2 in) tail 4–6 cm (2 in) forearm length Habitat: Savanna	LC Unknown
White-bellied yellow bat	S. leucogaster Cretzschmar, 1826 Two subspecies: S. l. damarensis; S. l. leucogaster	Sub-Saharan Africa	Size: 7–8 cm (3 in), plus 3–6 cm (1–2 in) tail 4–6 cm (2 in) forearm length Habitat: Savanna	LC Unknown

Genus Scotorepens – Troughton, 1943 – four species
Common name	Scientific name and subspecies	Range	Size and ecology	IUCN status and estimated population
Eastern broad-nosed bat	S. orion (Troughton, 1937)	Eastern Australia	Size: 4–6 cm (2 in), plus 2–4 cm (1–2 in) tail 3–4 cm (1–2 in) forearm length Habitat: Forest	LC Unknown
Inland broad-nosed bat	S. balstoni (Thomas, 1906) Two subspecies: S. b. balstoni; S. b. influatus	Australia	Size: 4–6 cm (2 in), plus 2–5 cm (1–2 in) tail 3–4 cm (1–2 in) forearm length Habitat: Forest, savanna, shrubland, and desert	LC Unknown
Little broad-nosed bat	S. greyii J. E. Gray, 1842	Australia	Size: 3–6 cm (1–2 in), plus 2–5 cm (1–2 in) tail 2–4 cm (1–2 in) forearm length Habitat: Desert, grassland, shrubland, savanna, and forest	LC Unknown
Northern broad-nosed bat	S. sanborni (Troughton, 1937)	Northern Australia, Timor-Leste, and Papua New Guinea	Size: 3–6 cm (1–2 in), plus 2–4 cm (1–2 in) tail 2–4 cm (1–2 in) forearm length Habitat: Forest and savanna	LC Unknown

Genus Scotozous – Dobson, 1875 – one species
Common name	Scientific name and subspecies	Range	Size and ecology	IUCN status and estimated population
Dormer's bat	S. dormeri Dobson, 1875	Southern Asia	Size: 3–6 cm (1–2 in), plus 2–5 cm (1–2 in) tail 3–4 cm (1–2 in) forearm length Habitat: Forest, shrubland, and desert	LC Unknown

Genus Tylonycteris – Peters, 1872 – six species
Common name	Scientific name and subspecies	Range	Size and ecology	IUCN status and estimated population
Amber bamboo bat	T. fulvida (Blyth, 1859)	Southern and southeastern Asia	Size: 3–5 cm (1–2 in), plus2–4 cm (1–2 in) tail 2–3 cm (1 in) forearm length Habitat: Forest	NE Unknown
Greater bamboo bat	T. robustula Thomas, 1915	Southeastern Asia	Size: 4–5 cm (2 in), plus 2–4 cm (1–2 in) tail 2–3 cm (1 in) forearm length Habitat: Forest	LC Unknown
Lesser bamboo bat	T. pachypus (Temminck, 1840) Five subspecies: T. p. aurex; T. p. bhaktii; T. p. fulvidus; T. p. meyeri; T. p. pachypus	Southeastern Asia	Size: 3–5 cm (1–2 in), plus 2–4 cm (1–2 in) tail 2–3 cm (1 in) forearm length Habitat: Forest	LC Unknown
Malayan bamboo bat	T. malayana Chasen, 1940	Southeastern Asia	Size: 4–5 cm (2 in), plus 2–4 cm (1–2 in) tail 2–3 cm (1 in) forearm length Habitat: Forest	NE Unknown
Pygmy bamboo bat	T. pygmaea Feng, Li, & Wang, 2008	Southeastern Asia	Size: 2–4 cm (1–2 in), plus 2–3 cm (1 in) tail 2–3 cm (1 in) forearm length Habitat: Unknown	DD Unknown
Tonkin bamboo bat	T. tonkinensis Tu, Csorba, Ruedi, & Hassanin, 2017	Southeastern Asia	Size: 4–5 cm (2 in), plus 2–4 cm (1–2 in) tail 2–3 cm (1 in) forearm length Habitat: Forest	NE Unknown

Genus Vespadelus – Troughton, 1943 – nine species
Common name	Scientific name and subspecies	Range	Size and ecology	IUCN status and estimated population
Eastern cave bat	V. troughtoni (Kitchener, Jones, & Caputi, 1987)	Eastern Australia	Size: 3–5 cm (1–2 in), plus 3–4 cm (1–2 in) tail 3–4 cm (1–2 in) forearm length Habitat: Forest and caves	LC Unknown
Eastern forest bat	V. pumilus J. E. Gray, 1841	Eastern Australia	Size: 3–5 cm (1–2 in), plus 2–4 cm (1–2 in) tail 2–4 cm (1–2 in) forearm length Habitat: Forest	LC Unknown
Finlayson's cave bat	V. finlaysoni (Kitchener, Jones, & Caputi, 1987)	Australia	Size: 3–5 cm (1–2 in), plus 3–5 cm (1–2 in) tail 3–4 cm (1–2 in) forearm length Habitat: Forest, savanna, shrubland, grassland, caves, and desert	LC Unknown
Inland forest bat	V. baverstocki (Kitchener, Jones, & Caputi, 1987)	Australia	Size: 3–5 cm (1–2 in), plus 2–4 cm (1–2 in) tail 2–4 cm (1–2 in) forearm length Habitat: Savanna, shrubland, and desert	LC Unknown
Large forest bat	V. darlingtoni Allen, 1933	Southeastern Australia	Size: 3–6 cm (1–2 in), plus 2–4 cm (1–2 in) tail 3–4 cm (1–2 in) forearm length Habitat: Forest and grassland	LC Unknown
Little forest bat	V. vulturnus (Thomas, 1914)	Eastern Australia	Size: 3–5 cm (1–2 in), plus 2–4 cm (1–2 in) tail 2–4 cm (1–2 in) forearm length Habitat: Forest	LC Unknown
Northern cave bat	V. caurinus (Thomas, 1914)	Northern Australia	Size: 3–4 cm (1–2 in), plus 2–4 cm (1–2 in) tail 2–4 cm (1–2 in) forearm length Habitat: Forest, savanna, shrubland, grassland, and caves	LC Unknown
Southern forest bat	V. regulus (Thomas, 1906)	Southern Australia	Size: 3–5 cm (1–2 in), plus 2–4 cm (1–2 in) tail 2–4 cm (1–2 in) forearm length Habitat: Forest and shrubland	LC Unknown
Yellow-lipped bat	V. douglasorum (Kitchener, 1976)	Northwestern Australia	Size: 3–5 cm (1–2 in), plus 3–5 cm (1–2 in) tail 3–4 cm (1–2 in) forearm length Habitat: Forest, savanna, shrubland, and caves	LC Unknown

Genus Vansonia – Roberts, 1946 – one species
Common name	Scientific name and subspecies	Range	Size and ecology	IUCN status and estimated population
Rüppell's bat	V. rueppellii J. B. Fischer, 1829 Six subspecies: V. r. coxi; V. r. fuscipes; V. r. pulcher; V. r. rueppellii; V. r. senegalensis; V. r. vernayi	Africa and southwestern Asia	Size: 4–6 cm (2 in), plus 2–5 cm (1–2 in) tail 2–4 cm (1–2 in) forearm length Habitat: Desert, shrubland, and savanna	LC Unknown

Genus Vespertilio – Linnaeus, 1758 – two species
Common name	Scientific name and subspecies	Range	Size and ecology	IUCN status and estimated population
Asian particolored bat	V. sinensis Peters, 1880 Five subspecies: V. s. andersoni; V. s. namiyei; V. s. noctula; V. s. orientalis; V. s. sinensis	Eastern Asia	Size: 5–8 cm (2–3 in), plus 3–6 cm (1–2 in) tail 4–6 cm (2 in) forearm length Habitat: Forest, inland wetlands, rocky areas, caves, desert, and coastal marine	LC Unknown
Parti-coloured bat	V. murinus Linnaeus, 1758 Two subspecies: V. m. murinus; V. m. ussuriensis	Europe and Asia	Size: 4–7 cm (2–3 in), plus 3–5 cm (1–2 in) tail 4–5 cm (2 in) forearm length Habitat: Forest, shrubland, grassland, rocky areas, caves, and desert	LC Unknown

== Sources ==
- Chernasky, Amy; Motis, Anna; Burgin, Connor, eds. (2023). All the Mammals of the World. Lynx Nature Books. ISBN 978-84-16728-66-4.
- Simmons, Nancy B. (2005). Wilson, Don E.; Reeder, DeeAnn M. (eds.). Mammal Species of the World. Vol. 1 (3rd ed.). Johns Hopkins University Press. ISBN 978-0-8018-8221-0.
- Nowak, Ronald M. (1994). Walker's Bats of the World. Johns Hopkins University Press. ISBN 978-0-8018-4986-2.
