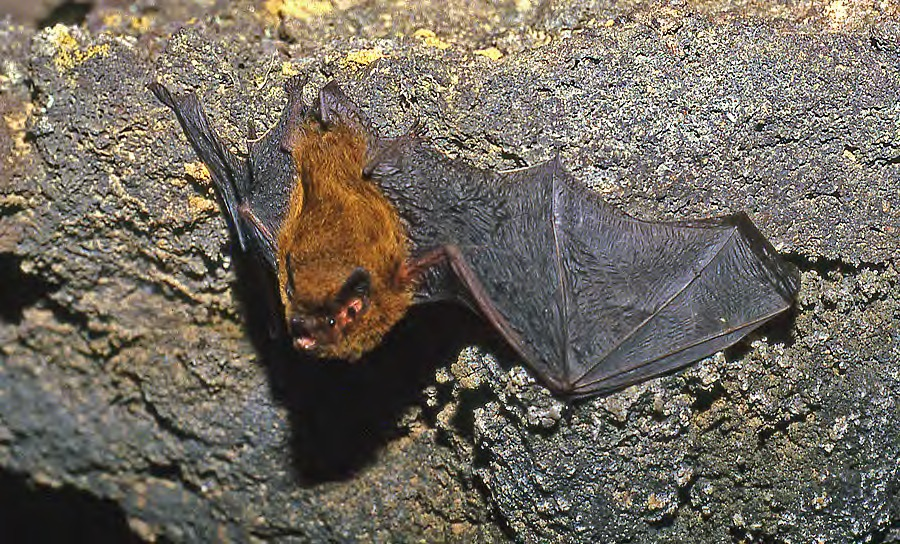

Conservation status
- Endangered (IUCN 3.1)

Scientific classification
- Kingdom: Animalia
- Phylum: Chordata
- Class: Mammalia
- Order: Chiroptera
- Family: Vespertilionidae
- Genus: Pipistrellus
- Species: P. maderensis

Binomial name
- Pipistrellus maderensis Dobson, 1878
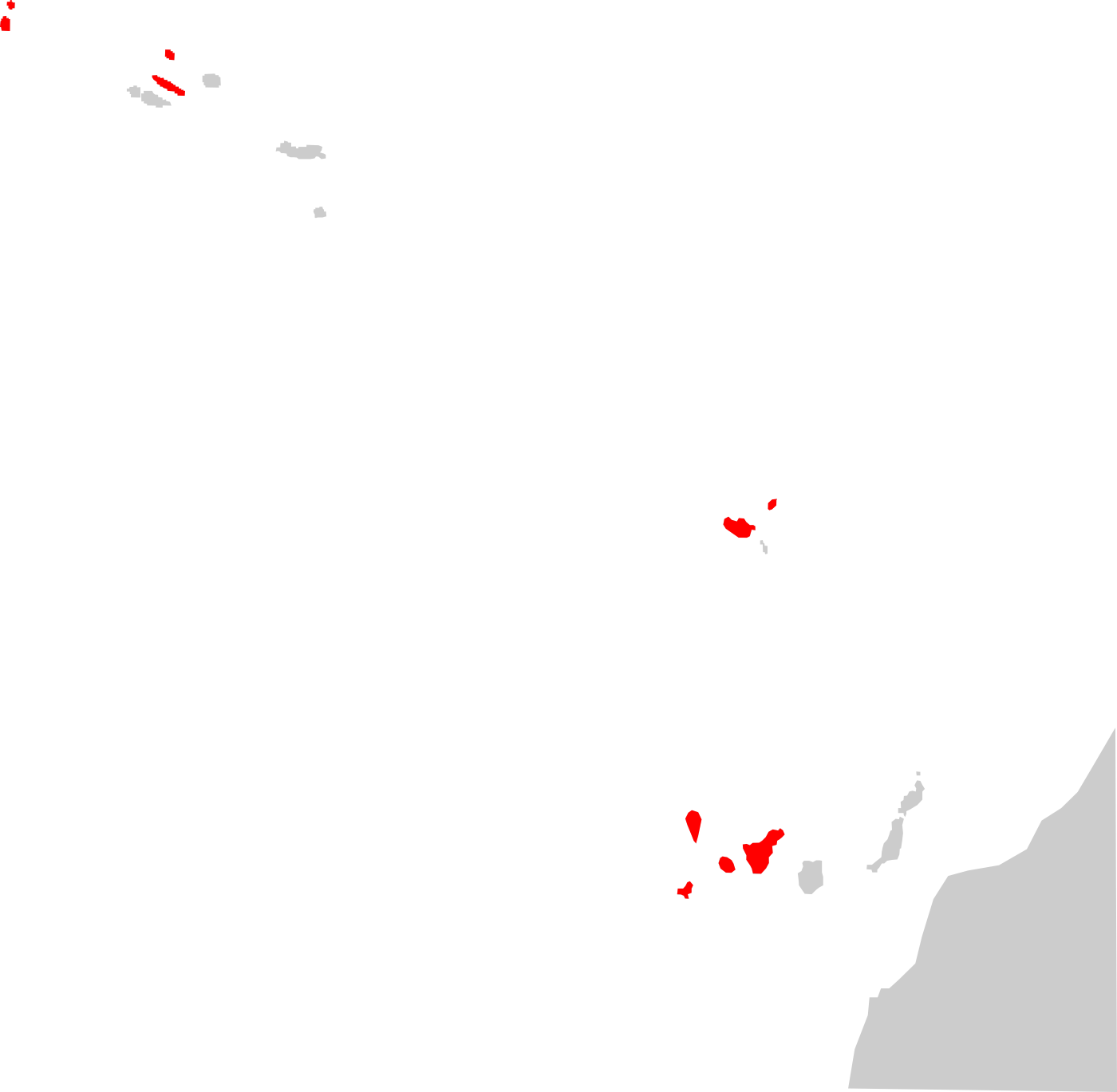

= Madeira pipistrelle =

Species of bat

The Madeira pipistrelle (Pipistrellus maderensis) is a species of vesper bat. It is endemic to Azores, Madeira and the Canary Islands.
