= Sind bat =

Conservation status
- Least Concern (IUCN 3.1)

Scientific classification
- Kingdom: Animalia
- Phylum: Chordata
- Class: Mammalia
- Order: Chiroptera
- Family: Vespertilionidae
- Subfamily: Vespertilioninae
- Genus: Rhyneptesicus; Bianchi, 1917
- Species: R. nasutus

Binomial name
- Rhyneptesicus nasutus (Dobson, 1877).

Synonyms
- Vesperugo (Vesperus) nasutus Dobson, 1877; Eptesicus nasutus (Dobson, 1877)

Species of bat

The Sind bat (Rhyneptesicus nasutus), also known as the Sind serotine bat or Persian serotine, is a species of vesper bat belonging to the family Vespertilionidae; this species the only member of the monospecific genus Rhyneptesicus. It inhabits forests and arid areas near waterbodies in southwestern Asia.

== Taxonomy ==
The Sind bat was first formally described as Vesperugo (Vesperus) nasutus in 1877 by the Irish zoologist George Edward Dobson with its type locality given as Shikarpur, Sind in modern Pakistan. In 1917 Valentin Bianchi proposed the genus Rhyneptesicus for what was then known as Eptesicus nasutus and subsequent studies have found that the Sind bat is not as closely related to the serotine bats as had been thought and indicated that Rhyneptesicusis a valid genus. This taxon is classified as incertae sedis within the subfamily Vespertilioninae of the family Vespertilionidae, in the suborder Yangochiroptera of the order Chiroptera.

Four subspecies of the Sind bat have been proposed:

- R. n. nasutus (Dobson, 1877) in southwest Pakistan, Afghanistan and Southeast Iran
- R. n. matschiei (Thomas, 1905) in southwest Arabia
- R. n. pellucens Thomas, 1906 in Iran and Iraq
- R. n. batinensis (Harrison, 1968) in southeast Arabia

== Description ==
The Sind bat was distinguished from the serotine bats by having compartively narrower, pointed ears, with a long tragus. Its teeth are also different with a unicuspid first upper incisor and complete molars with protocrista. The baculum is simlar to those of Eptesicus bats. The fur is short, yellow on the back fading on the breast and belly to pale buff, nearly white. The wing membrane is pale brown crossed by white vermiculations. The length of the head and body of this bat is 40 to 56 mm (1.6 to 2.2 in) and the tail length is 38 to 49 mm (1.5 to 1.9 in).

== Distribution and habitat ==
The Sind bat occurs in the Arabian Peninsula, Iraq, Iran, Pakistan and Afghanistan. In 2019, its presence was confirmed in Bahrain. It is mainly associated with lowland semi-desert and desert environments but also inhabits coastal regions and highlands. In some areas, it is associated with human habitation, farmland, shelterbelts and around water.

== Behaviour and ecology ==
The Sind bat roosts in wall crevices and in ruined buidings in Oman, and uses caves elsewhere, roosting in small colonies with up to around 20 individuals. It apparently feeds mainly on beetles, but also catches swarming ants and other prey. Females give birth in mid-April in south-eastern Iran, while in Oman pregnant females were found in late March. The litter size is one or two pups.
