= Neoromicia grandidieri =

Conservation status
- Data Deficient (IUCN 3.1)

Scientific classification
- Kingdom: Animalia
- Phylum: Chordata
- Class: Mammalia
- Order: Chiroptera
- Family: Vespertilionidae
- Genus: Neoromicia
- Species: N. grandidieri

Binomial name
- Neoromicia grandidieri (Dobson, 1876)

Synonyms
- Vesperugo grandidieri Dobson, 1876; Pipistrellus grandidieri (Dobson, 1876); Eptesicus grandidieri (Dobson, 1876)

Species of bat

Neoromicia grandidieri, known by the common names of Dobson's pipistrelle and yellow pipistrelle, is a species of vesper bat found in Africa. It was formerly in the genus Pipistrellus

== Taxonomy ==
Neoromicia grandidieri was described as a new species in 1876 by Irish zoologist George Edward Dobson, who placed it in the now-defunct genus Vesperugo. Its scientific name was Vesperugo (Vesperus) grandidieri. The eponym for the species name "grandidieri " was Alfred Grandidier, a French naturalist who collected the holotype from Zanzibar. Some consider Neoromicia grandidieri to have two subspecies: the nominate subspecies (N. g. grandidieri) and N. g. angolensis. It is the only member of the Afropipistrellus subgenus.

== Description ==
It is considered a very small microbat. Individuals have forearm lengths of 33–38 mm (1.3–1.5 in) and weights of 7–8 g (0.25–0.28 oz). It has a dental formula of 2.1.1.33.1.2.3 for a total of 32 teeth. It has blackish-brown wing membranes, pale brown fur, and brown ears.

== Range and habitat ==
N. g. grandidieri occurs in East Africa, while P. g. angolensis occurs in Angola, Malawi, and Cameroon.
