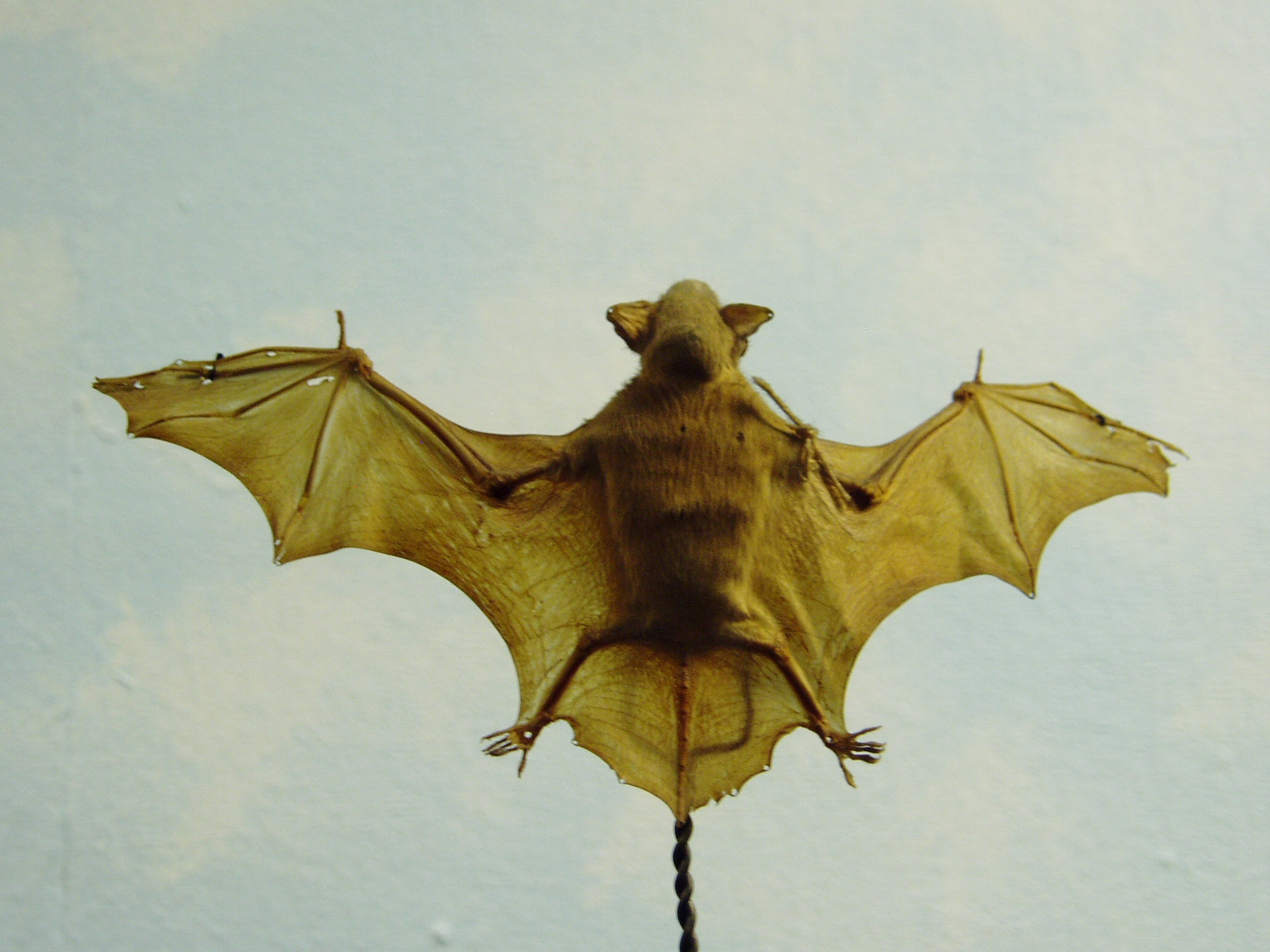
- Lesser bamboo bat (Tylonycteris pachypus)

Scientific classification
- Kingdom: Animalia
- Phylum: Chordata
- Class: Mammalia
- Order: Chiroptera
- Family: Vespertilionidae
- Tribe: Vespertilionini
- Genus: Tylonycteris; Peters, 1872

Type species
- Vespertilio pachypus Temminck, 1840

Species
- See text

= Bamboo bat =

Genus of bats

The bamboo bats are a genus of vesper bats in the genus Tylonycteris. The name translates as "padded bat", and refers to the presence of hairless fleshy pads on the hands and feet, which the bats use to help them grip onto bamboo. The species in this genus roost within bamboo shoots.

The species within this genus are:

- Blyth's bamboo bat, Tylonycteris fulvida
- Malayan bamboo bat, Tylonycteris malayana
- Lesser bamboo bat, Tylonycteris pachypus
- Pygmy bamboo bat, Tylonycteris pygmaeus
- Greater bamboo bat, Tylonycteris robustula
- Tonkin bamboo bat, Tylonycteris tonkinensis

Traditionally, the genus was considered to have only two species, T. robustula and T. pachypus. A new species, pygmaea, was described in 2008, a 2014 study analyzed the subspecies T. pachypus fulvida as distinct enough to be a full species, and then T. tonkinensis and T. malayana were split from T. robustula based in a 2017 by Tu et al.
