= Andreas Kiefer =

Austrian politician (born 1957)

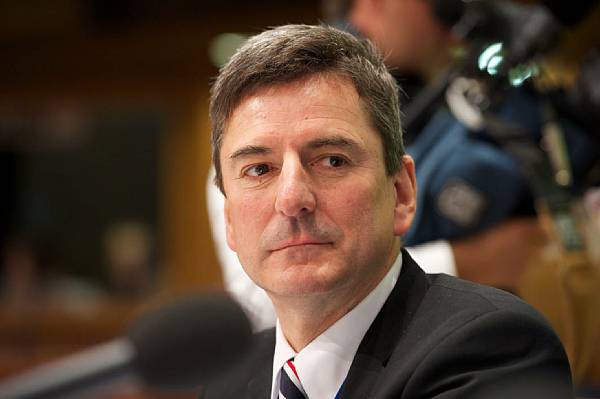
Kiefer in 2013

Andreas Kiefer (born 6 October 1957 in Salzburg) is an Austrian politician. Since 2010, he is Secretary General of the Congress of Local and Regional Authorities of the Council of Europe, an institution representing local and regional authorities of the 47 member states of the Council of Europe.

== Education and career ==
Following his childhood in Salzburg, Kiefer studied law at Salzburg University and economics at the University of Linz. He graduated from his studies with a PhD in law in 1984.

Beginning in 1984, Kiefer worked as Chef de Cabinet of Hans Katschthaler, the vice-governor and later governor of the State of Salzburg. Kiefer played a key role in the creation of the Euroregion Salzburg - Berchtesgadener Land - Traunstein with nearly 100 municipalities, the first Euroregion with Austrian participation. Following Austria's accession to the European Union in 1995, Kiefer became Director of the European Affairs Service of the State of Salzburg regional government. Kiefer was the first national coordinator of the Austrian delegation to the Committee of the Regions of the European Union. In the Council of Europe he has worked for all Congress members of the State of Salzburg since 1995 and as a representative of the Austrian states in the Congress working group on Regions with Legislative Powers since 1999.

From 2000 to 2009 Kiefer represented the Austrian states in the Intergovernmental Conferences of the European Union on the Treaty on a Constitution for Europe and the Lisbon Treaty at working level.

At municipal level Andreas Kiefer served as chairman and member of municipal electoral committees for municipal, regional, federal and European elections and initiated a citizens' participation project to integrate new residents and to create a municipal mission statement in the municipality of Kuchl in Salzburg.

In March 2010, Kiefer was elected Secretary General of the Congress of Local and Regional Authorities of the Council of Europe for a term of five years by the Parliamentary Assembly. He has since been re-elected in 2015 and in November 2020.

== Academic activities ==
Andreas Kiefer has been a speaker at a number of international conferences and has given lectures at universities and post graduate courses. He has published widely about local self-government, regionalism, federalism, interregional and cross-border co-operation, regions with legislative powers, the Austrian political system, about the local and regional dimension in the Council of Europe and the Committee of the Regions. Kiefer is active member of the Network of Authors of the European Center for Research in Federalism at the University of Tübingen. He is also member of the academic advisory council of the European Academy of Bozen/Bolzano.

== Publications ==
- Europe is facing both integration and fragmentation, in: Shelest, Hanna and Kapitonenko, Mykola (eds.): Europe of Regions, Kyiv 2019. Ukraine Analytica, issue 2 (16), 2019.
- The European dimension of the work of the regional parliament: from traditional foreign policy to European domestic affairs, In: Kriechbaumer, Robert and Voithofer, Richard (eds.): Politik im Wandel. Der Salzburger Landtag im Chiemseehof 1868-2018, Wien 2018.
- 1988 – 2018: 30 years of the European Charter of Local Self-Government – an interim assessment of its core provisions, In: Europäisches Zentrum für Föderalismus-Forschung (ed.): Jahrbuch des Föderalismus 2018. Föderalismus, Subsidiarität und Regionen in Europa. Baden-Baden: Nomos Verlagsgesellschaft, 2018.
- Local authorities: the knots in the net of democratic societies – the contribution of the Congress of Local and Regional Authorities, In: Frédéric VALLIER (ed.): “Europe 2030: Local leaders speak out”. Paris, Editions Autrement, 2018
- Municipalities and regions in the Council of Europe: committed to local and regional democracy since 1957, In: Ebert, Kurt (ed.): Festschrift für Herwig van Staa. Innsbruck, October 2014.
- Monitoring activities of the Congress of Local and Regional Authorities of the Council of Europe, In: Alber, Elisabeth und Zwilling, Carolin (eds.), Gemeinden im Europäischen Mehrebenensystem: Herausforderungen im 21. Jahrhundert, Schriftenreihe der Europäischen Akademie Bozen, Bereich “Minderheiten und Autonomien”, Reihenherausgeber: Joseph Marko und Francesco Palermo, Nomos, Baden-Baden, 2014.
- Europe on the threshold of a new dimension in cross-border co-operation, In: Bundesministerium des Innern (ed.): Grenzüberschreitende Zusammenarbeit mit deutscher Beteiligung. Ein Erfahrungsaustausch. Berlin; August 2014.
- 25 years of the European Charter for local self-government – the legal basis for local democracy in Europe, In: Schweizer Vereinigung für den Rat der Gemeinden und Regionen Europas (SVRGRE) / Association Suisse pour le Conseil des Communes et Régions d’Europe (ASCCRE) (ed.): Die lokale Selbstverwaltung / L’autonomie locale en questions. Lausanne; 2013.
- Political will to act and commitment – Hans Katschthaler as convinced promoter of a Europe of the Regions, In: Neureiter, Michael and Dr. Hans Lechner Forschungsgesellschaft (eds.): Hans Katschthaler - für Bildung, Kultur und Natur. Salzburg, March 2013.
- The Congress of Local and Regional Authorities: Fundamental reform and new dynamics for monitoring, in: Europäisches Zentrum für Föderalismus-Forschung (Hg.), Jahrbuch des Föderalismus 2012. Baden-Baden 2012.
- Human Rights: Local and regional authorities in action, in: Wolfgang Benedek et al. (Hg.), European Yearbook on Human Rights 2011. Wien 2011.
- European and external relations of the Austrian Länder with a specific reference to Land Salzburg, in: Carlos P. Amaral (Hg.), Regional Autonomy and International Relations. New Dimensions of Multilateral Governance. Paris 2011.
- European Grouping of Territorial Cooperation (EGTC) and Euroregional Cooperation Grouping (ECG). Two legal instruments for cross-border cooperation, in: Birte Wassenberg, Joachim Beck (Hg.), Living and Researching. Cross-Border Cooperation (Volume 3): The European dimension. Stuttgart 2011.
- Regions and foreign/external relations within the framework of the member states of the Council of Europe – experiences from Austria and with an aspect of the relations to regions and institutions from EU countries, in: Europarat et al. (Hg.), International and external economic links of the subjects of the Russian Federation. Closing the Council of Europe project during 1994-2006. Moskau 2007.
- The Contribution of the Regions with Legislative Competences to the European Constitutional Process, in: Institut der Regionen Europas (Hg.), Occasional Papers 2/2007. The EU-Constitutional Treaty and the Regions of Europe. Salzburg 2007.
- Reform of Federalism in Austria, in: Europarat (Hg.), The constitutional status of the regions in the Russian Federation and in other European Countries. Straßburg 2003.
- Gesetzgebende Regionalparlamente und ihr europäischer Verband: die CALRE, in: Europäisches Zentrum für Föderalismus-Forschung (Hg.), Jahrbuch des Föderalismus 2006. Föderalismus, Subsidiarität und Regionen in Europa. Baden-Baden 2006.
- Die Bundesstaatsreform im Jahr 1993. Von der 'Politischen Vereinbarung über die Neuordnung des Bundesstaates' zu konkreten Verfassungsentwürfen des Bundes und der Länder, in: Andreas Kohl et al. (Hg.), Österreichisches Jahrbuch für Politik 1993. Wien/München 1994.
- EuRegio Salzburg - Berchtesgadener Land / Traunstein: 'Grenzenlose Nachbarschaft'. Ein Projekt nachbarschaftlicher Zusammenarbeit im salzburgisch-bayerischen Grenzgebiet. Salzburg 1994.
- Länderrechte, Regionalismus und EG, in: Andreas Kohl et al. (Hg.), Österreichisches Jahrbuch für Politik 1992. Wien 1993.

== Private life ==
Kiefer is married to Carmen Kiefer, who works as public relations consultant under vice-mayor of the town of Kuchl. They have three children. Their son Severin Kiefer is a figure skater (pairs).
