= Pygmy bamboo bat =

Conservation status
- Data Deficient (IUCN 3.1)

Scientific classification
- Kingdom: Animalia
- Phylum: Chordata
- Class: Mammalia
- Order: Chiroptera
- Family: Vespertilionidae
- Genus: Tylonycteris
- Species: T. pygmaea

Binomial name
- Tylonycteris pygmaea Feng, Li e Wang, 2008

Species of bat

The pygmy bamboo bat (Tylonycteris pygmaea) is a species of vesper bat in the family Vespertilionidae. It is found in Southwest China and was discovered in 2007. The species is around 4 cm (1.6 in) long and weighs between 2.6 and 3.5 g (0.092 and 0.12 oz).
