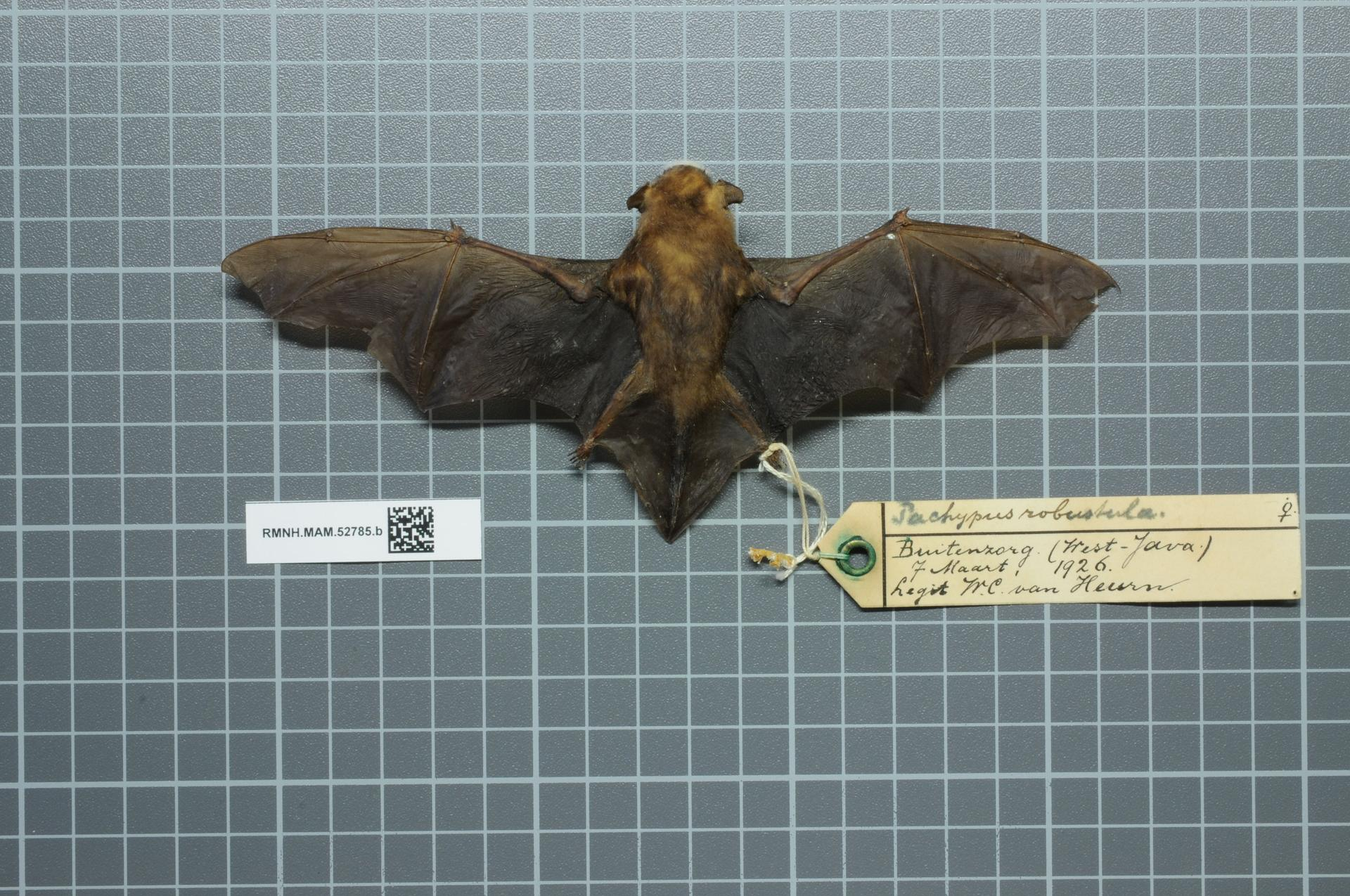

Conservation status
- Least Concern (IUCN 3.1)

Scientific classification
- Kingdom: Animalia
- Phylum: Chordata
- Class: Mammalia
- Order: Chiroptera
- Family: Vespertilionidae
- Genus: Tylonycteris
- Species: T. robustula

Binomial name
- Tylonycteris robustula Thomas, 1915
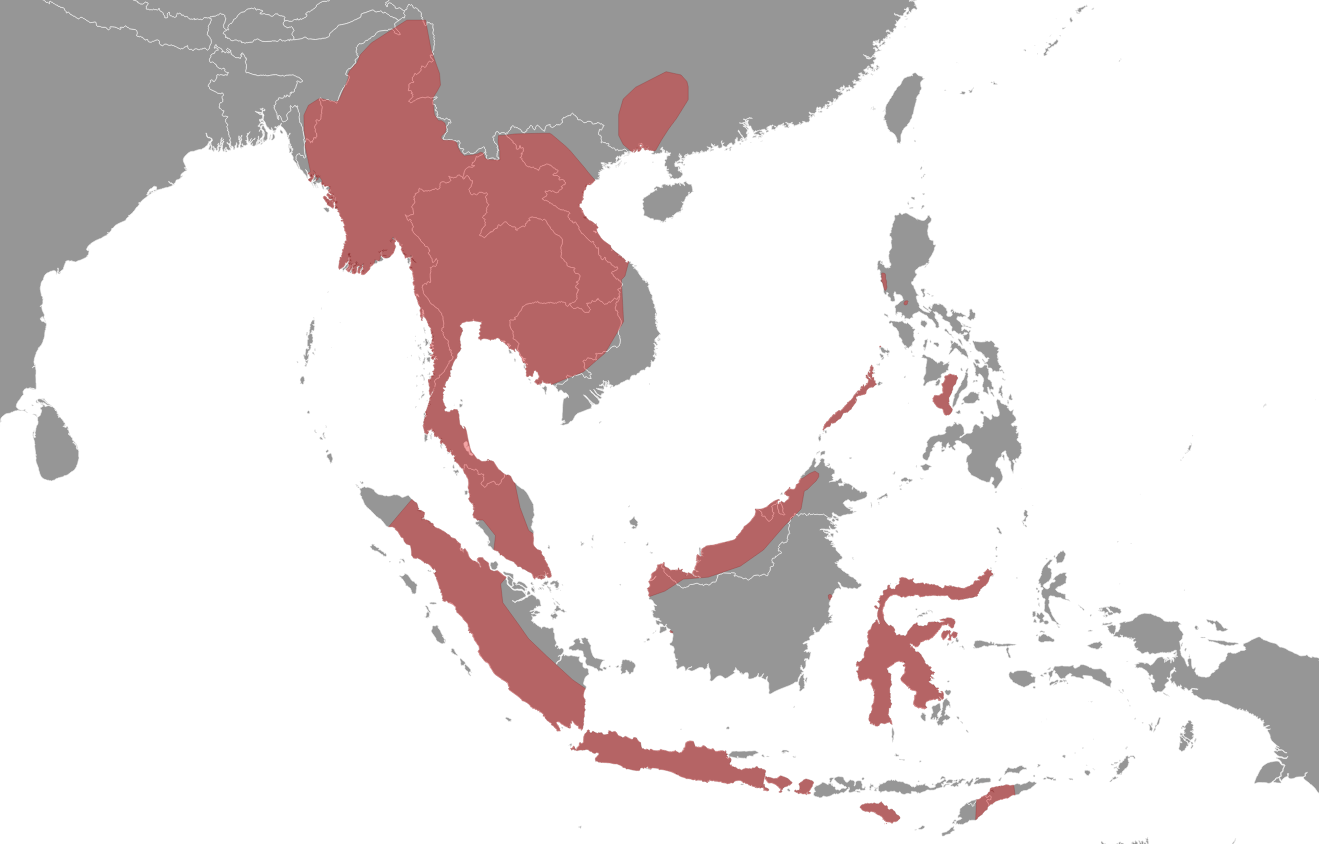

= Greater bamboo bat =

Species of bat

The greater bamboo bat (Tylonycteris robustula) is a species of vesper bat in the family Vespertilionidae. It has a wide range within Southern and Southeast Asia, including Brunei, Cambodia, China, India, Indonesia, Laos, Malaysia, Myanmar, the Philippines, Singapore, Thailand, Timor-Leste, and Vietnam. They have been found at elevations up to 1,500 metres (4,900 ft).

== Taxonomy ==
The species was initially described by Oldfield Thomas in 1915, in On bats of the genera Nyctalus, Tylonycteris, and Pipistrellus.

It formerly had two subspecies, Tylonycteris robustula malayana and Tylonycteris robustula robustula. A 2017 paper reanalyzed T. malayana as a full species.

== Description ==
Like other bats in Tylonycteris, greater bamboo bats are quite small, weighing between 3 grams (0.11 oz) and 10 grams (0.35 oz). They have a forearm length of 22 millimetres (0.87 in) to 32 millimetres (1.3 in). Compared to other bats, the genus has a flattened skull, and has pads on the thumb and base of the foot. Within the genus, the greater bamboo bat is one of the larger species, similar both in size and appearance to T. malayana and T. tonkinensis.

The greater bamboo bat is insectivorous. A study in Guangxi, China found that their diet consisted of the orders Hymenoptera, Diptera (flies), and Coleoptera (beetles), as well as trace amounts of Orthoptera, Trichoptera (caddisflies), and Ephemeroptera (mayflies). They roost in loose groups of up to 40 in bamboo forests, within the hollows inside the bamboo shoots, called internodes. They access the internodes through small holes bored in the bamboo by beetles. A study in Selangor, Malaysia found that the bats used the bamboo species Gigantochloa scortechinii.

The greater bamboo bats mate in November and December and give birth around April or May, usually to twins. Young are typically weaned in June.

Predators include the paradise tree snake, which can extract them from within their bamboo roosts.
