= George Edward Dobson =

Irish zoologist

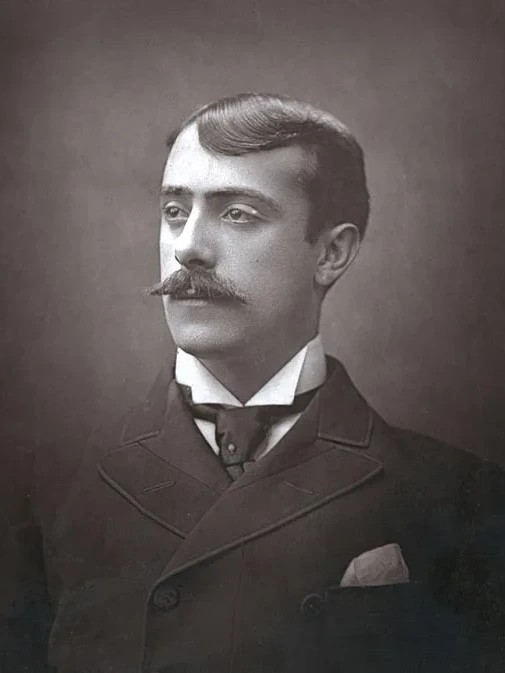
- Born: 4 September 1848; Edgeworthstown, County Longford, Ireland
- Died: 26 November 1895 (aged 47)
- Scientific career
- Fields: zoology

George Edward Dobson FRS FLS FZS (4 September 1848 at Edgeworthstown, County Longford, Ireland – 26 November 1895) was an Irish zoologist, photographer and army surgeon. He took a special interest in bats, describing many new species, and some species have been named after him.

== Biography ==
Dobson was the eldest son of Parke Dobson and was educated at the Royal School Enniskillen and then at Trinity College, Dublin. He gained the degrees of Bachelor of Arts in 1866, Bachelor of Medicine, Bachelor of Surgery and Master of Surgery in 1867 and Master of Arts in 1875.

He became an army surgeon after 1867 serving in India and rose to the position of surgeon major. In 1868 he visited the Andaman Islands, collecting zoological specimens for the Indian Museum along with Wood-Mason, and in May 1872 he made ethnological and photographic studies of the Andamanese peoples.

Around 1878, he became curator of the Royal Victoria Museum at Netley.

== Achievements ==
Dobson was an expert on small mammals, especially bats (Chiroptera) and Insectivora. He was a member of several scientific societies, the Royal Society (elected 1883), the Linnean Society of London and the Zoological Society of London. He was a corresponding member of the Academy of Natural Sciences of Philadelphia and of the Biological Society of Washington.

== Works ==
- Catalogue of the Chiroptera in Collection of British Museum (1878)
- Monograph of the Asiatic Chiroptera (1876)
- A Monograph of the Insectivora, systematic and anatomical (three parts, John Van Voorst, Londres, 1882-1890.

In addition Dobson also contributed to the ninth edition of the Encyclopædia Britannica where he wrote the accounts about the vampyre bats, the moles and the shrews.
