= Rhogeessa velilla =

Conservation status
- Data Deficient (IUCN 3.1)

Scientific classification
- Kingdom: Animalia
- Phylum: Chordata
- Class: Mammalia
- Order: Chiroptera
- Family: Vespertilionidae
- Genus: Rhogeessa
- Species: R. velilla

Binomial name
- Rhogeessa velilla Thomas, 1903

Species of bat

Rhogeessa velilla, also called the Ecuadorian little yellow bat, is a species of vesper bat in the genus Rhogeessa. It is found in Northwestern Peru and parts of Ecuador. The species was previously included in R. io, but is now recognized as a separate species. Very little is known about this species, though it is generally considered to be insectivorous.

== Taxonomy ==
Rhogeessa velilla was described as a new species in 1903 by British zoologist Oldfield Thomas. The holotype was collected by Perry O. Simons on Puná Island in 1898. In 1958, George Gilbert Goodwin published that he considered it a subspecies of the little yellow bat (R. parvula). In 1973, R. K. LaVal published that it should instead be considered a subspecies of the black-winged little yellow bat (R. tumida). In 1996, Hugh H. Genoways and Robert James Baker elevated Thomas's yellow bat (R. io) from a subspecies of the black-winged little yellow bat; R. velilla was then considered synonymous with R. io. In 2008, Amy Baird published that R. velilla should be considered a full species, as its karyotype of 2n = 42 differs from R. parvula, R. tumida, and R. io.

== Range and habitat ==
The species is found in Puná Island and the Guayas and El Oro Provinces on the mainland of Ecuador, along with northwestern Peru. It is found in tropical dry forests at a range of elevations from 0–550 m (0–1,804 ft) above sea level. There are some protected areas over its distribution, mostly private reserves, but also a Peruvian national park, Cerros de Amotape National Park.

== Conservation ==
As of 2017, it is evaluated as a data deficient species by the IUCN. It meets the criteria for this designation as it was only recently recognized as a full species. Additionally, little information is available on its population and distribution, though it seems locally rare. It might be threatened by habitat destruction, as its range may be restricted to tropical dry forests.
