= Bark scorpion =

Bark scorpion may refer to:

- Various Centruroides species, including:
  - Baja California bark scorpion (Centruroides exilicauda)
  - Arizona bark scorpion (Centruroides sculpturatus)
  - Striped bark scorpion (Centruroides vittatus)
- Australian bark scorpion (Lychas marmoreus)
