= Menchu's little yellow bat =

Conservation status
- Data Deficient (IUCN 3.1)

Scientific classification
- Kingdom: Animalia
- Phylum: Chordata
- Class: Mammalia
- Order: Chiroptera
- Family: Vespertilionidae
- Genus: Rhogeessa
- Species: R. menchuae

Binomial name
- Rhogeessa menchuae Baird, Marchán-Rivadeneira, Pérez & Baker, 2012
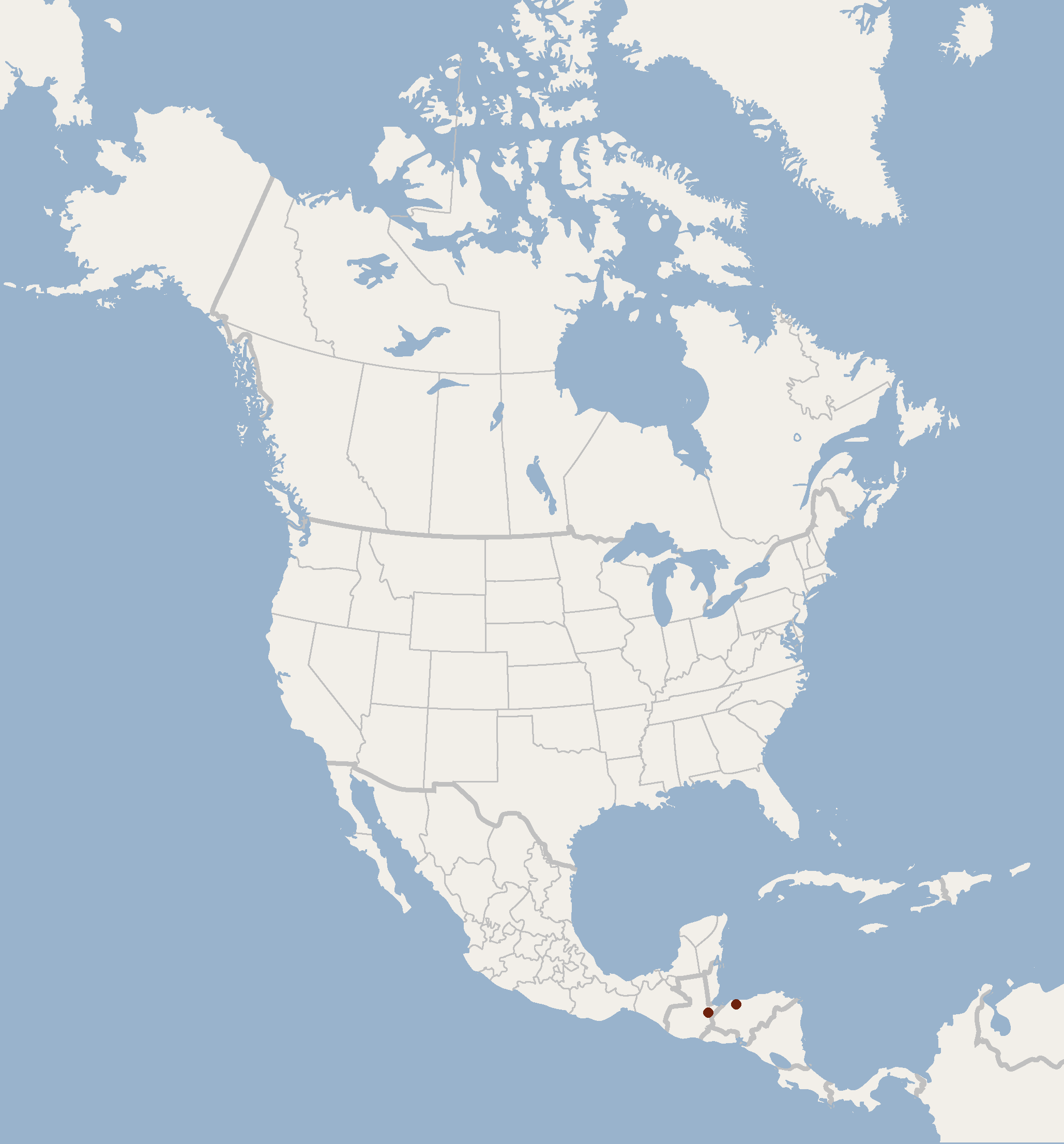
- Range of Menchu's little yellow bat

Species of bat

Menchu's little yellow bat (Rhogeessa menchuae) is a species of vesper bat found in Central America. It was described as a new species in 2012.

== Taxonomy and etymology ==
Menchu's little yellow bat was described as a new species in 2012 by Baird et al. Morphological and genetic analyses differentiated it from the black-winged little yellow bat, R. tumida. The holotype was collected by R. D. Bradley in 1991 in the Atlántida Department of Honduras. The eponym for the species name "menchuae" is Rigoberta Menchú. The authors wanted to honor Menchú for "her decades of work establishing a better understanding of the Mayan culture in Guatemala."

== Description ==
Menchu's little yellow bat is a medium-sized member of its genus with a total length of 69–76 mm (2.7–3.0 in). Its dental formula is 1.1.1.33.1.2.3 for a total of 30 teeth.

== Range and status ==
Menchu's little yellow bat is known only from Guatemala and Honduras. Its range possibly extends into southern Belize and northern Nicaragua. As of 2017, Menchu's little yellow bat was listed as a data deficient species by the IUCN. The threats faced by this species are unknown.
