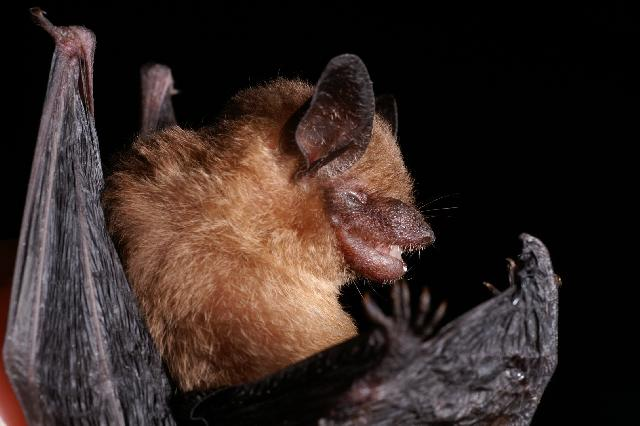
- Yucatan yellow bat (Rhogeessa aeneus)

Scientific classification
- Kingdom: Animalia
- Phylum: Chordata
- Class: Mammalia
- Order: Chiroptera
- Family: Vespertilionidae
- Tribe: Antrozoini
- Genus: Rhogeessa; H. Allen, 1866

Type species
- Rhogeessa tumida H. Allen, 1866

Species
- See text

= Rhogeessa =

Genus of bats

Rhogeessa is a genus of bats within the vesper bats family, Vespertilionidae.

== Species ==
- Yucatan yellow bat (R. aenea)
- Bickham's little yellow bat (Rhogeessa bickhami)
- Genoways's yellow bat (R. genowaysi)
- Husson's yellow bat (R. hussoni)
- Thomas's yellow bat (R. io)
- Menchu's little yellow bat (R. menchuae)
- Tiny yellow bat (R. minutilla)
- Least yellow bat (R. mira)
- Little yellow bat (R. parvula)
- Rhogeessa permutandis
- Black-winged little yellow bat (R. tumida)
- Ecuadorian little yellow bat (R. velilla)

== Taxonomy debate ==
This genus is systematically complex and sometimes controversial. One reason that the genus is complex is because of the species' variable karyotypes:

30 chromosomes	32 chromosomes	34 chromosomes	42 chromosomes	44 chromosomes	52 chromosomes
R. io	R. aeneus	R. tumida*	R. genowaysi	R. parvula	R. hussoni
R. tumida*	-	R. velilla	-	R. tumida*	
R. gracilis	-	-	-	-	-
R. tumida*	-	-	-	-	-

*Note that R. tumida is listed four times, as individuals have been found with four different karyotypes. This may represent a species complex.

Some have placed Allen's yellow bat into its own genus, Baeodon based on its differences with other members of the genus. However, others argue that as Allen's yellow bat and the slender yellow bat are sister taxa, to exclude only one from Rhogeessa makes it a paraphyletic group. By that logic, either both species need to be included in Rhogeessa, or both need to be placed in Baeodon. A 2008 paper recommended moving the slender yellow bat to the Baeodon genus. Others say that Baeodon should be recognized as a subgenus of Rhogeessa instead of as a separate genus.
