= Bickham's little yellow bat =

Conservation status
- Least Concern (IUCN 3.1)

Scientific classification
- Kingdom: Animalia
- Phylum: Chordata
- Class: Mammalia
- Order: Chiroptera
- Family: Vespertilionidae
- Genus: Rhogeessa
- Species: R. bickhami

Binomial name
- Rhogeessa bickhami Baird, Marchán-Rivadeneira, Pérez & Baker, 2012
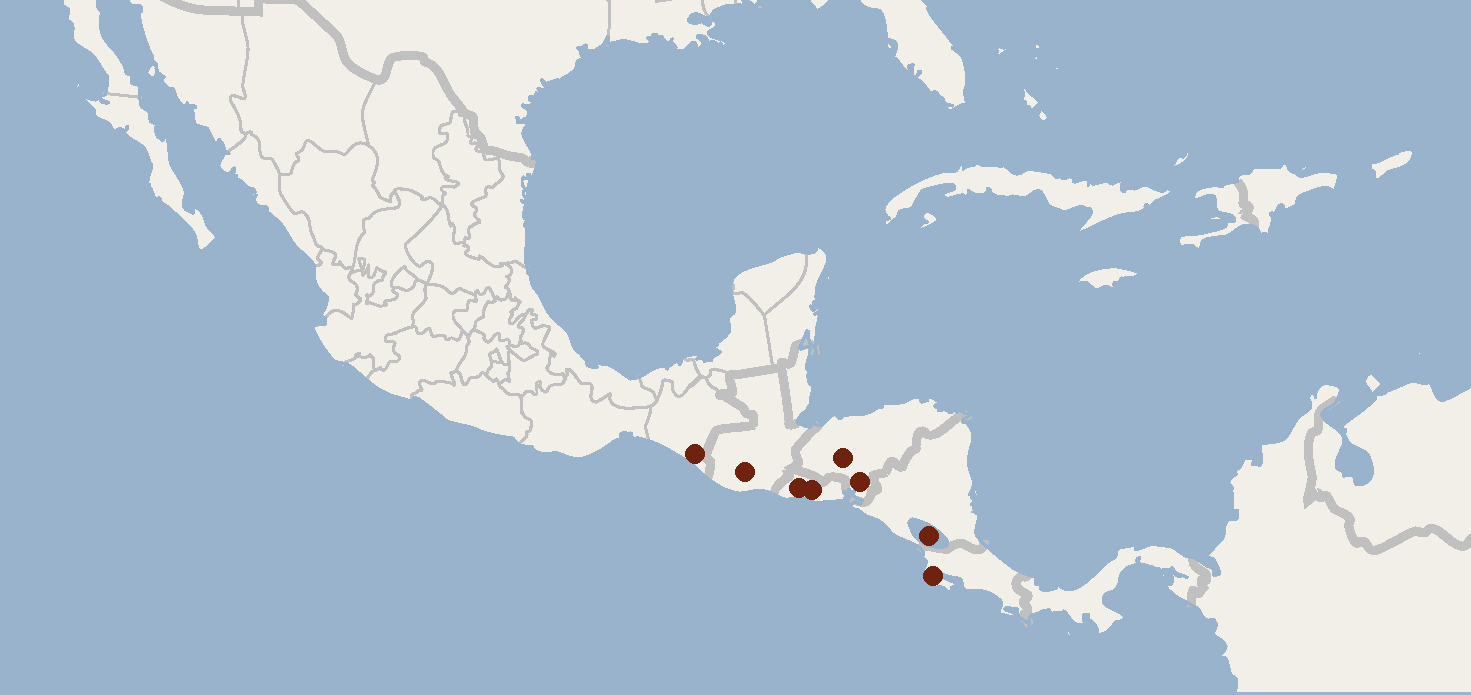
- Geographic range

Species of bat

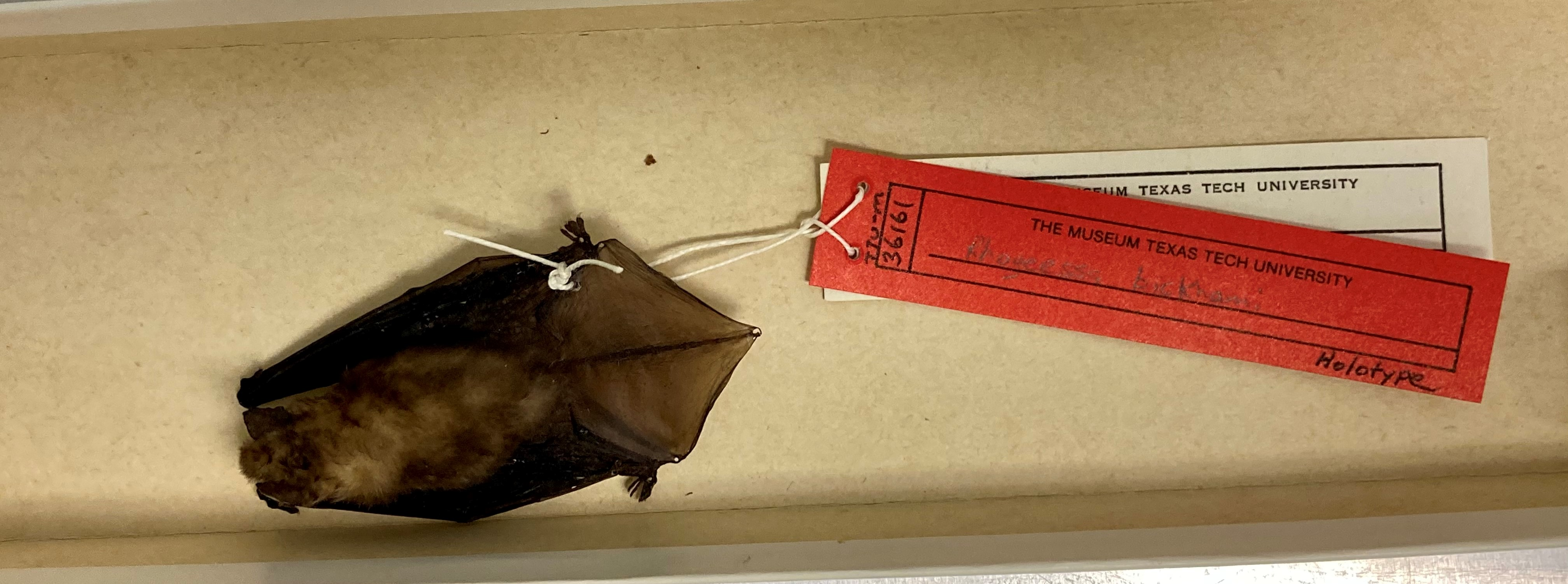
Holotype of Rhogeessa bickhami in the Natural Science Research Laboratory's (NSRL) collection at the Museum of Texas Tech University.

Bickham's little yellow bat (Rhogeessa bickhami) is a species of vesper bat found in Central America.

== Taxonomy and etymology ==
It was described as a new species in 2012. The holotype had been collected by L. W. Robbins in May 1981, 23.6 mi (38.0 km) north of Huixtla, Mexico. The eponym for the species name "bickhami" is John W. Bickham, who has researched other bat species of this genus, as well as other mammals.

== Description ==
It is considered "medium sized" for its genus, with a head to tail length of 66–78 mm (2.6–3.1 in). It is a diploid organism with two sets of each chromosome (2n=34). It has a dental formula of 1.1.1.33.1.2.3 for a total of 30 teeth.

== Biology and ecology ==
It is insectivorous, catching and consuming insects while flying.

It is found in Costa Rica, El Salvador, Guatemala, Honduras, Mexico, and Nicaragua.

As of 2017, it is evaluated as a least-concern species by the IUCN.
