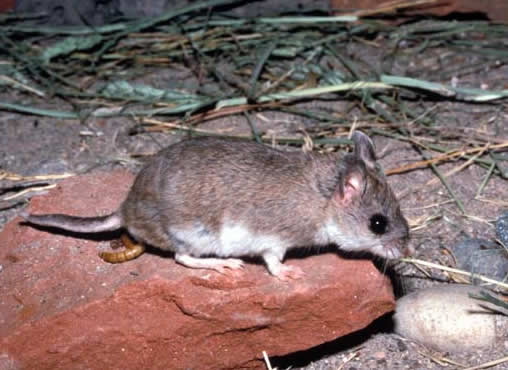

Conservation status
- Least Concern (IUCN 3.1)

Scientific classification
- Kingdom: Animalia
- Phylum: Chordata
- Class: Mammalia
- Order: Rodentia
- Family: Cricetidae
- Subfamily: Neotominae
- Genus: Onychomys
- Species: O. arenicola

Binomial name
- Onychomys arenicola Mearns, 1896

Synonyms
- Onychomys torridus arenicola Mearns, 1896

= Mearns's grasshopper mouse =

Species of rodent

Mearns's grasshopper mouse or the Chihuahuan grasshopper mouse (Onychomys arenicola) is a grasshopper mouse found in southwestern New Mexico, West Texas, and north-central Mexico. They are similar to Onychomys torridus, but differ in karyotype and size. This mouse is smaller in every regard except for the nasal length of the skull.

They are found in semiarid habitat, prairie, and scrub. They feed largely on insects and other invertebrates, including scorpions. They also feed on small muroid rodents and pocket mice.
