= Husson's yellow bat =

Conservation status
- Data Deficient (IUCN 3.1)

Scientific classification
- Kingdom: Animalia
- Phylum: Chordata
- Class: Mammalia
- Infraclass: Placentalia
- Order: Chiroptera
- Family: Vespertilionidae
- Genus: Rhogeessa
- Species: R. hussoni

Binomial name
- Rhogeessa hussoni Genoways & Baker, 1996
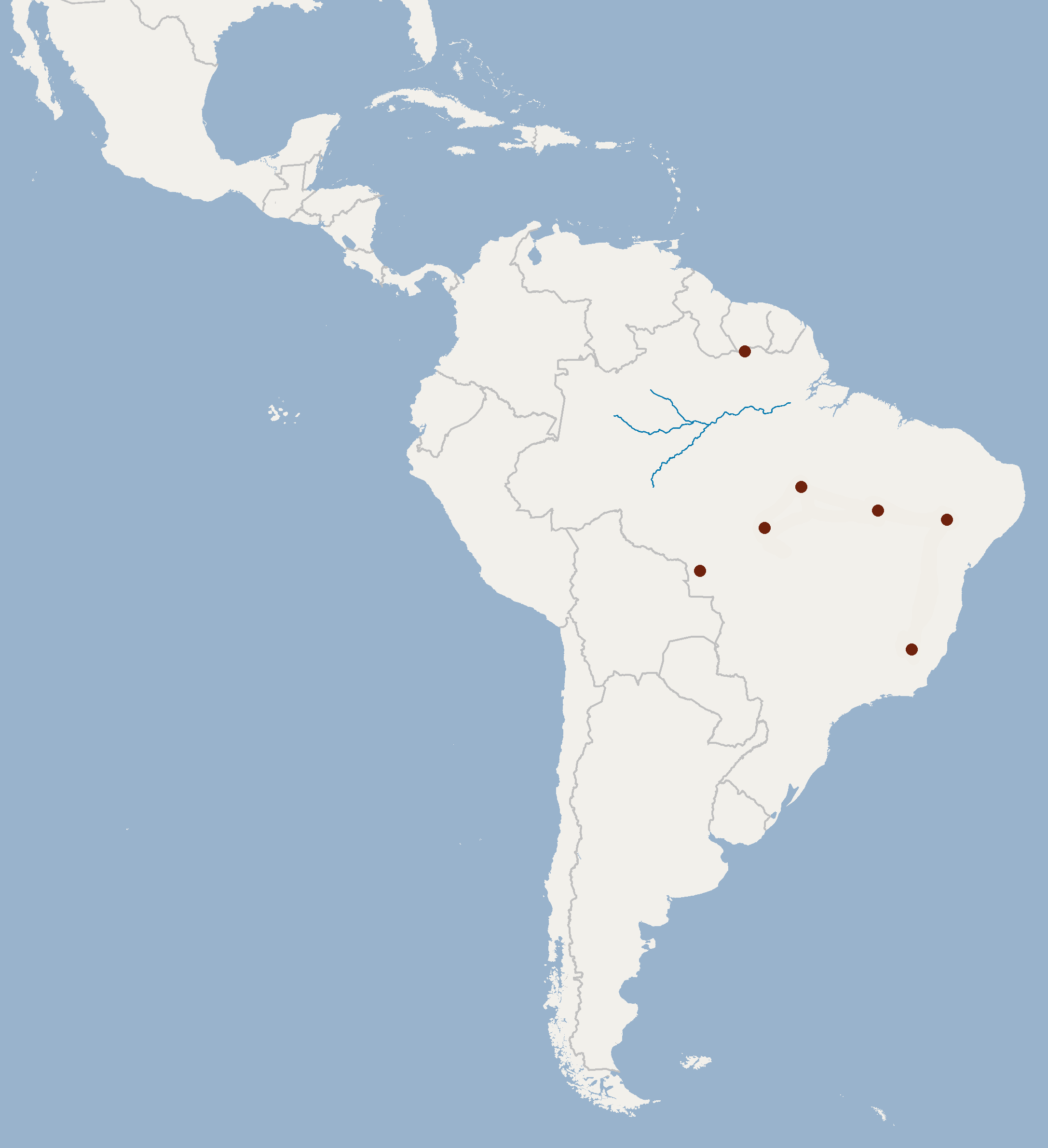

Species of bat

Husson's yellow bat (Rhogeessa (Rhogeessa) hussoni) is a species of vesper bat found in Suriname and southern Brazil.

== Description ==
Husson's yellow bat is primarily distinguished from other species in the genus Rhogeessa (particularly from R. io which is also found in Brazil) by its fur colour. Both its ventral and dorsal fur is golden brown with brown tips. Its muzzle is similar to that found in the genus Eptesicus with more obvious pads than R. io. Cranial measurements including breadth of the upper canines and palate, and the length of the teeth across the maxillary bone were all larger in Husson's yellow bat.

== Conservation status ==
There have been difficulties capturing vesper bats using the usual methods and problems differentiating the different species within the genus Rhogeessa. As a result of this, very little is known about the species and the IUCN has listed it as data deficient. It is likely to be threatened by loss of habitat.
