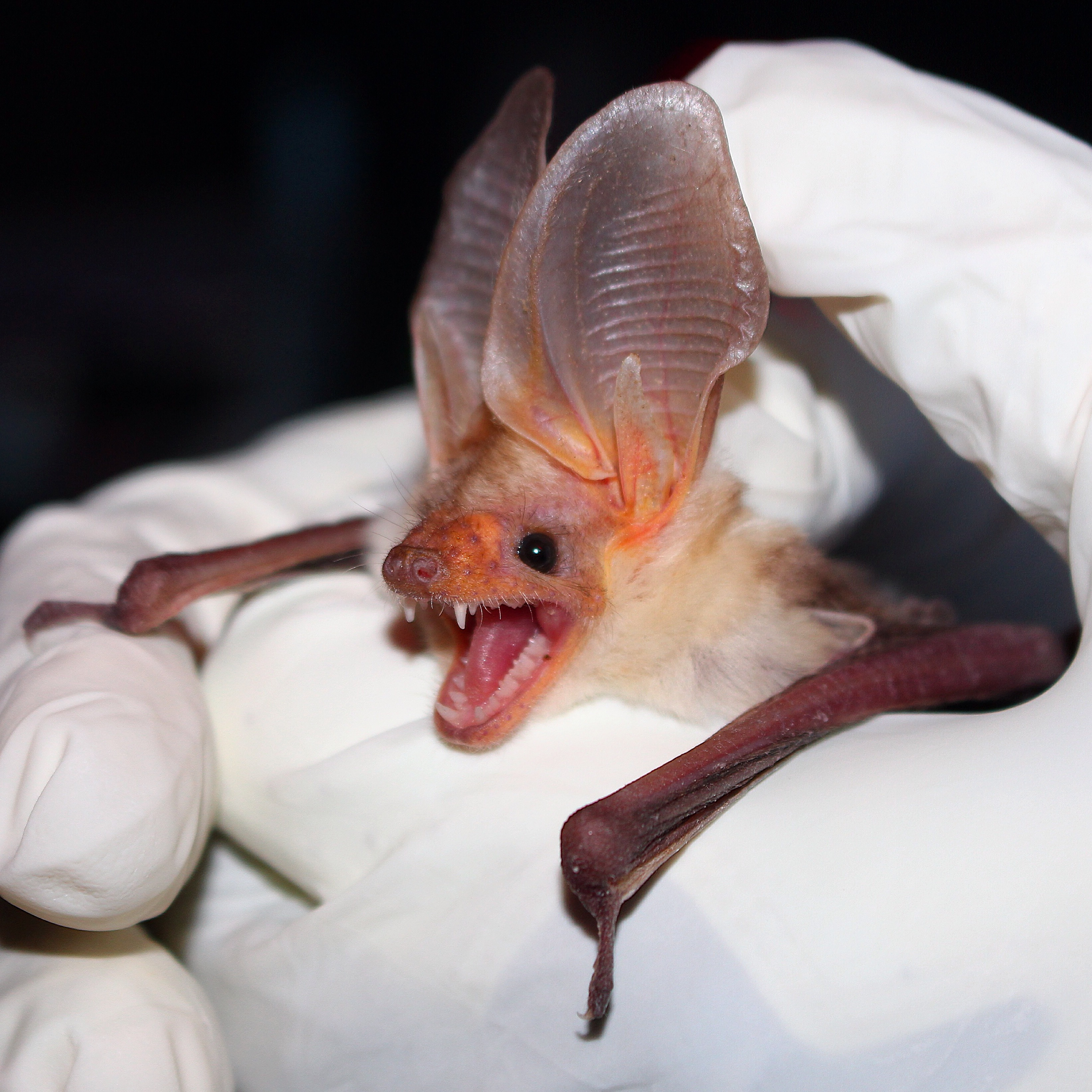
- Pallid bat (Antrozous pallidus)

Scientific classification
- Kingdom: Animalia
- Phylum: Chordata
- Class: Mammalia
- Order: Chiroptera
- Family: Vespertilionidae
- Subfamily: Vespertilioninae
- Tribe: Antrozoini; Miller, 1897

Type genus
- Antrozous H. Allen, 1862

Genera
- Antrozous; Bauerus; Rhogeessa

= Antrozoini =

Tribe of bats

Antrozoini is a tribe of bats in the subfamily Vespertilioninae of the family Vespertilionidae. It contains the pallid bat (Antrozous pallidus), Van Gelder's bat (Bauerus dubiaquercus), the genus Rhogeessa, and the fossil Anzanycteris. All species in this tribe are found in the Americas.

== Taxonomy ==
The pallid bat (Antrozous pallidus) was first described in 1856 and first placed in its own genus, Antrozous, in 1862. Several suggestions were made early on about its relationships, including that of Wilhelm Peters in 1865, who placed it in the family Vespertilionidae and considered it to be related to the Australian Nyctophilus. Others suggested a relationship with the vespertilionid genus Plecotus or the Phyllostomidae. In 1897, Gerrit S. Miller described a subfamily Antrozoinae for the pallid bat, but ten years later chose to place Nyctophilus and Antrozous together in a subfamily Nyctophilinae.

Van Gelder's bat was described in 1959 as Antrozous (Bauerus) dubiaquercus; subsequently, the species has been placed in its own genus, Bauerus, while others have retained it in Antrozous with its close relative, the pallid bat, with the current consensus being toward placing them in separate genera. In 1970, Karl F. Koopman and J. Knox Jones recognized a tribe Antrozoini (comprising only Antrozous and Bauerus), which they still placed within Nyctophilinae. In a separate 1970 paper, however, Koopman questioned the affinities between the North American antrozoines and the Australasian Nyctophilus on the basis of biogeography. The next year, Ronald Pine and colleagues further questioned this relationship on the basis of baculum (penis bone) characters, although they cautioned that more penes of Bauerus needed to be studied. Since then, Antrozoini has generally been considered a valid tribe in the subfamily Vespertilioninae, which includes most members of Vespertilionidae.

In 1998, Nancy B. Simmons argued that Antrozoini was not, in fact, closely related to other Vespertilioninae and instead placed the two species in their own family, Antrozoidae, which she considered closer to the Molossidae, another family of bats. However, this hypothesis was later refuted by DNA sequence data, which indicated that the Antrozoini nested within Vespertilioninae. Therefore, Simmons placed the two species in Vespertilionidae in the 2005 third edition of Mammal Species of the World, but she kept them as a subfamily separate from Vespertilioninae, called Antrozoinae, because of continued phylogenetic uncertainty. However all DNA studies place antrozoines in Vespertilioninae, and this led Steven Hoofer and Ronald Van Den Bussche (2003) as well as Zachary Roehrs and colleagues (2010) to classify them as a tribe, Antrozoini, within that subfamily.

Hoofer and Van Den Bussche, who used mitochondrial DNA (mtDNA) sequences in their study, also expanded Antrozoini to include the American genera Rhogeessa and Baeodon (which are often combined as Rhogeessa). These genera were previously placed in the tribe Nycticeiini and considered to be related to the Old World genus Otonycteris. In their 2010 paper, Roehrs and colleagues again found that mtDNA sequences supported a relationship between Antrozous, Bauerus, Rhogeessa, and Baeodon, but what limited nuclear DNA data for Baeodon they had suggested that the genus may be more closely related to Lasiurus.

== Distribution and fossil record ==
The pallid bat occurs in northern Mexico, the western United States (east to Kansas and Texas), and marginally southwestern Canada (British Columbia). It is also found on Cuba; the population there has been classified as a separate species, Antrozous koopmani, by some authorities, but it is now included in the pallid bat. Van Gelder's bat is found from Nayarit in western Mexico south and east to Costa Rica. Most species of Rhogeessa occur in Mexico, but several occur further south, reaching to Bolivia and Brazil. The single species of Baeodon, B. alleni, is restricted to Mexico.

The oldest fossils identified as Antrozous come from the Barstovian (Middle Miocene) of Nebraska; however, their attribution to the genus is tentative. Undoubted Antrozous come from the Hemphillian (Late Miocene) of Texas and additional fossils are from the Pliocene of Texas, Idaho, and Florida. No fossils of Bauerus or Baeodon are known; the only fossils of Rhogeessa come from the Pleistocene of Inciarte in Venezuela. In 1969, John A. White named the genus Anzanycteris on the basis of Pliocene fossils from California (originally identified as Pleistocene) and included it in Nyctophilinae. Later, Malcolm C. McKenna and Susan K. Bell listed Anzanycteris under Antrozoini in their 1997 Classification of Mammals.

== Literature cited ==
- Czaplewski, N.J. 1993. Pizonyx wheeleri Dalquest and Patrick (Mammalia: Chiroptera) from the Miocene of Texas referred to the genus Antrozous H. Allen (subscription required). Journal of Vertebrate Paleontology 13(3):378–380.
- Czaplewski, N.J., Rincón, A.D. and Morgan, G.S. 2005. Fossil bat (Mammalia: Chiroptera) remains from Inciarte Tar Pit, Sierra de Perijá, Venezuela. Caribbean Journal of Science 41(4):768–781.
- Hoofer, S.R. and Van Den Bussche, R.A. 2001. Phylogenetic relationships of plecotine bats and allies based on mitochondrial ribosomal sequences (subscription required). Journal of Mammalogy 82(1):131–137.
- Hoofer, S.R. and Van Den Bussche, R.A. 2003. Molecular phylogenetics of the chiropteran family Vespertilionidae. Acta Chiropterologica 5(supplement):1–63.
- Kays, R.W. and Wilson, D.E. 2000. Mammals of North America. Princeton and Oxford: Princeton University Press, 240 pp. ISBN 0-691-07012-1
- McKenna, M.C. and Bell, S.K. 1997. Classification of Mammals: Above the species level. New York: Columbia University Press, 631 pp. ISBN 978-0-231-11013-6
- Miller, G.S. Jr. 1897. Revision of the North American bats of the family Vespertilionidae. North American Fauna 13:1–136.
- Miller, G.S. Jr. 1907. The families and genera of bats. Bulletin of the United States National Museum 57:1–282.
- Pine, R.H., Carter, D.C. and LaVal, R.K. 1971. Status of Bauerus Van Gelder and its relationships to other nyctophiline bats (subscription required). Journal of Mammalogy 52(4):663–669.
- Roehrs, Z.P., Lack, J.B. and Van Den Bussche, R.A. 2010. Tribal phylogenetic relationships within Vespertilioninae (Chiroptera: Vespertilionidae) based on mitochondrial and nuclear sequence data (subscription required). Journal of Mammalogy 91(5):1073–1092.
- Simmons, N.B. 2005. Order Chiroptera. Pp. 312–529 in Wilson, D.E. and Reeder, D.M. (eds.). Mammal Species of the World: a taxonomic and geographic reference. 3rd ed. Baltimore: The Johns Hopkins University Press, 2 vols., 2142 pp. ISBN 978-0-8018-8221-0
- White, J. A. 1969. Late Cenozoic bats (subfamily Nyctophilinae) from the Anza-Borrego Desert of California. Miscellaneous Publications of the Museum of Natural History, University of Kansas 51:275–282.
