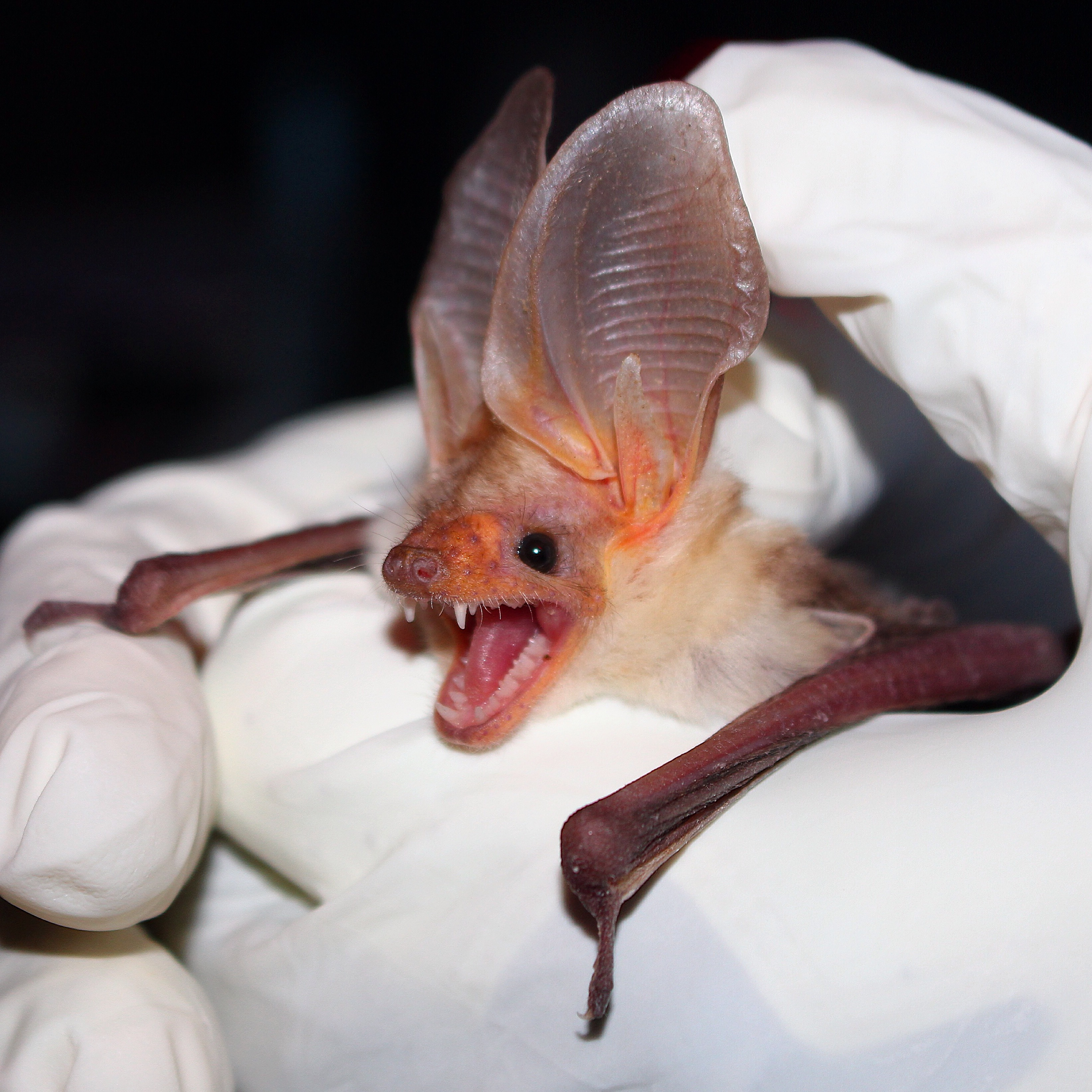

Conservation status
- Least Concern (IUCN 3.1)

Scientific classification
- Kingdom: Animalia
- Phylum: Chordata
- Class: Mammalia
- Order: Chiroptera
- Family: Vespertilionidae
- Tribe: Antrozoini
- Genus: Antrozous; H. Allen, 1862
- Species: A. pallidus

Binomial name
- Antrozous pallidus (LeConte, 1856)
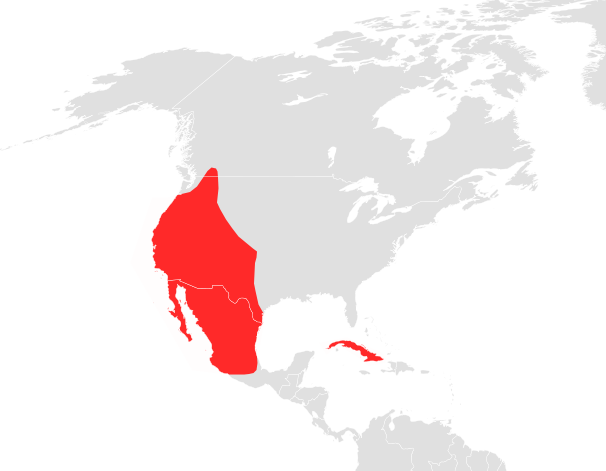
- Pallid bat range

= Pallid bat =

Species of bat

The pallid bat (Antrozous pallidus) is a species of bat that ranges from western Canada to central Mexico. It is the sole species of its genus and is closely related to Van Gelder's bat (Bauerus dubiaquercus), which is sometimes included in Antrozous. Although it has in the past been placed in its own subfamily (Antrozoinae) or even family (Antrozoidae), it is now considered part of the subfamily Vespertilioninae and the tribe Antrozoini.

It is the state bat of California.

== Description ==
Pallid bats have a head and body length of approximately 2.75 inches (6.2-7.9 cm), forearm length of approximately 2.1 inches (4.5–6 cm), a tail of approximately 1.75 inches (3.9-4.9 cm), and a wingspan of 15-16 inches (38–40 cm). They weigh 14-25 grams. These bats are large, with long forward pointing ears (over 2.5 cm). Fur is pale at the roots, brown on their back, with a light underside. Pallid bats have a blunt piglike snout. The dental formula for pallid bats is 1.1.1.32.1.2.3 × 2 = 28. The bacula of pallid bats are wedge or spade-shaped, generally with a short narrow base which widens and then tapers towards the tip. The bone also has a characteristic downward 'dip' around the midpoint, with a raised base and tip.

== Ecology ==
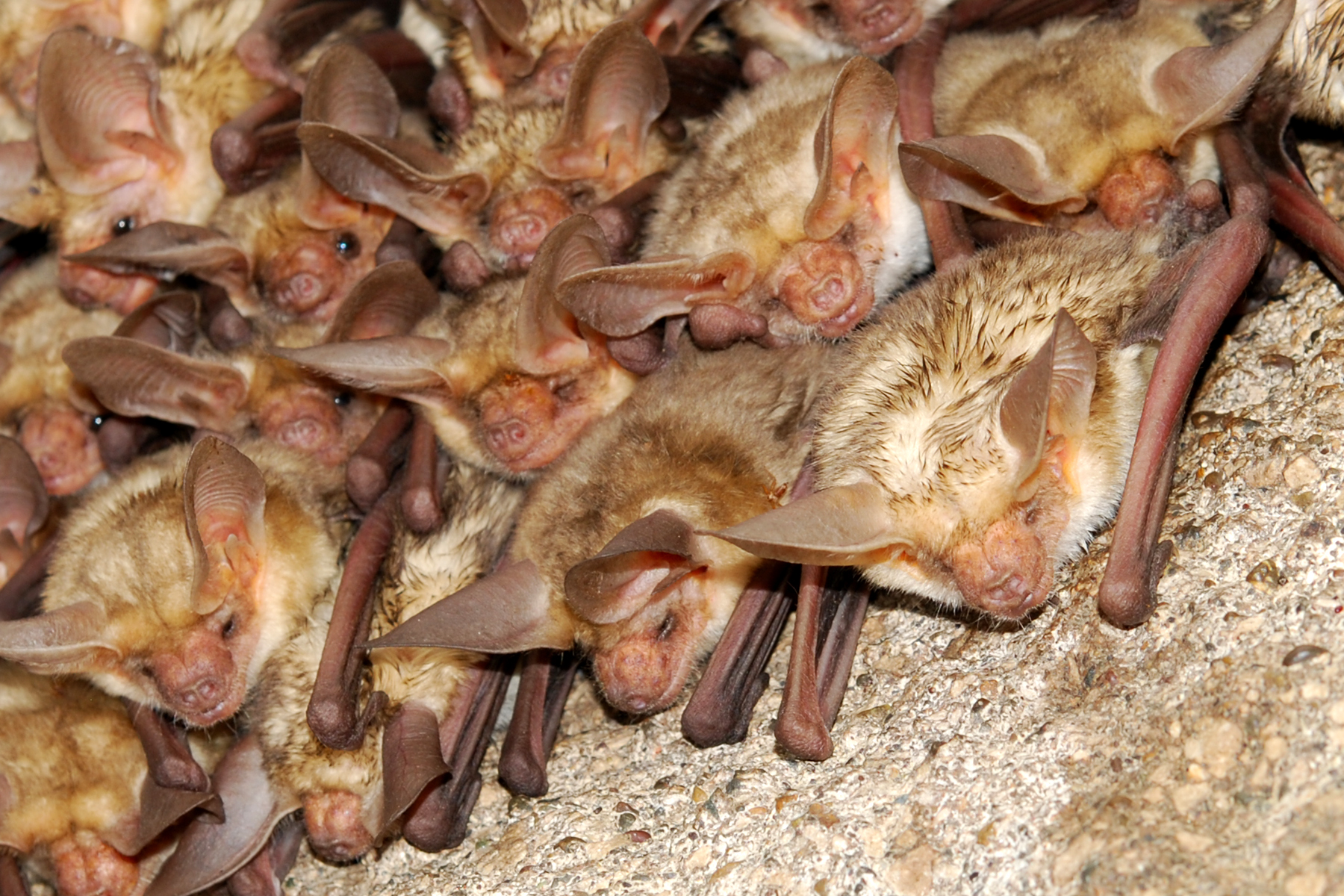
A colony of roosting A. pallidus at Madera Canyon, Santa Rita Mountains, southeastern Arizona

Pallid bats are typically found in arid or semi-arid habitats, often in mountainous or rocky areas near water. They are also found over open, sparsely vegetated grasslands. During the day time, pallid bats typically roost in cracks and crevices, which may include tile roofs, exfoliating bark of trees, or rocky outcrops. During the night, this species will often use a night roost that is closer to their foraging grounds than their day roost. A night roost is usually less protected than a day roost; open porches may be used as night roosts by this species. In the winter time, this species may dip into shallow bouts of torpor, often in buildings, caves, or cracks in rocks.

Pallid bats are insectivores that feed on arthropods such as crickets, and are capable of consuming up to half their weight in insect every night. Pallid bats are gleaners, capturing prey from the ground and transporting it to their night roost for consumption. When foraging, pallid bats typically fly at low heights of 1–2 m off the ground. Pallid bats most notably consume Arizona bark scorpions, which are the most venomous scorpions in North America: their stings can be fatal to humans. Pallid bats were found to have one or more missense mutations that substitute amino acids in their voltage-gated sodium channels, which may be responsible for their resistance to scorpion venom. Although pallid bats are primarily insectivores, they exhibit some flexibility in their diet when seasonally feeding on Mexican columnar cacti (particularly cardón cactus) nectar in spring, and even cactus fruit in summer. Pallid bats are also more effective pollinators than some of the nectarivorous bats with whom they compete for cacti.

Like many other bat species, pallid bats are heterothermic, meaning they can be either poikilothermic or homoeothermic ( cold blooded and warm blooded) depending on the time of year. They have the ability to control their body temperature and equilibrate it with the environment during winter hibernation and whenever they rest.

Pallid bat size varies greatly depending on their habitat. Bats in areas of low primary productivity, such as the desert, tend to be smaller due to less availability of resources. The bats that reside in areas with more primary productivity, such as coastal regions tend to be on the larger side. Larger pallid bats also have craniums that allow them to eat larger, harder prey more easily.

== Behavior and natural history ==
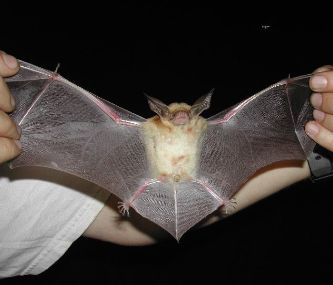
Wingspan of the pallid bat

The mating season ranges from October to February, when the bats are in hibernation. Male bats store sperm in the spring and summer, a process driven by changes in melatonin as a response to decreasing daylight hours. Copulation occurs in autumn and females store the sperm until spring, when they emerge from hibernation and go through estrus. The female bat gives birth to one or two pups during early June; they weigh about 3 to 3.5 g (0.11 to 0.12 oz) at birth and in four or five weeks are capable of making short flights. Pups are weaned after 40 to 45 days. They do not attain adult size until about eight weeks of age, and do not become sexually mature until after around two years.

Like the majority of bat species, pallid bats are capable of using echolocation while foraging and traveling from their roost sites to foraging grounds. However, they may also opt to not echolocate while foraging, and instead use their large ears to locate insects on the ground. As gleaners, they primarily rely on auditory cues produced by prey instead of echolocation to hunt. The rise of anthropogenic noise pollution, such as traffic, in their habitats is negatively impacting their foraging and can reduce efficiency by up to three times.

Pallid bats have been identified in the fossil record from late Pleistocene deposits in the western United States and Cuba.

== Predation ==
Pallid bats feed on the ground, which makes them vulnerable to terrestrial predators and injury. Terrestrial predators may include snakes, domestic cats, foxes (Vulpes), coyotes, and raccoons. Adults and young bats are mainly preyed upon by snakes or crepuscular and nocturnal raptors, mainly owls.

== See also ==
- Bats of the United States
- Bats of Canada
