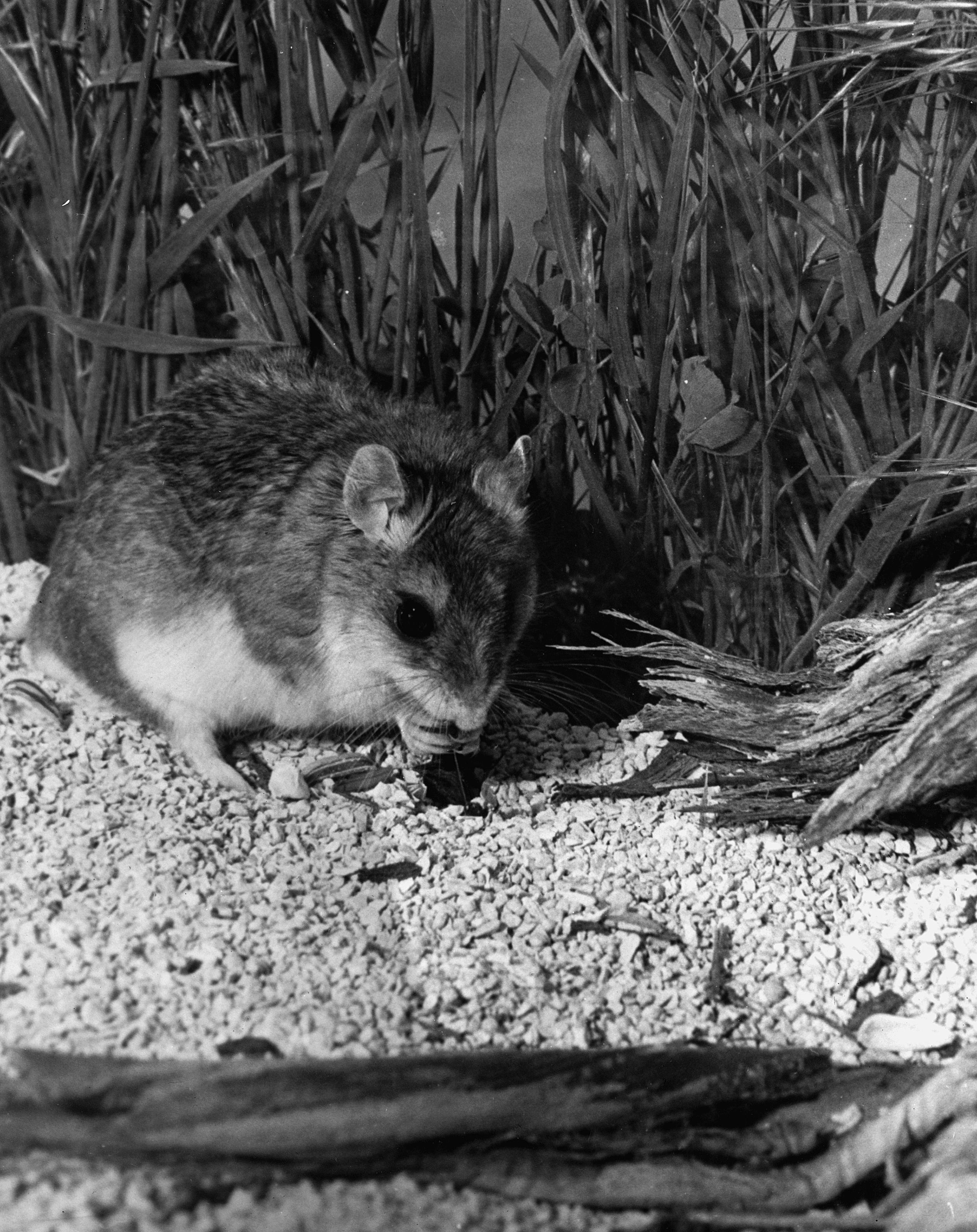
- A grasshopper mouse eating a beetle

Scientific classification
- Kingdom: Animalia
- Phylum: Chordata
- Class: Mammalia
- Order: Rodentia
- Family: Cricetidae
- Subfamily: Neotominae
- Tribe: Reithrodontomyini
- Genus: Onychomys; Baird, 1857

Type species
- Hypudaeus leucogaster

Species
- Onychomys arenicola; Onychomys leucogaster; Onychomys torridus

= Grasshopper mouse =

Grasshopper mice Temporal range: Early Pliocene – Present

Genus of rodents

Grasshopper mice are rodents of the genus Onychomys, occurring in North America. They feed on insects and other arthropods.

== Biology ==
The three species in this genus of New World mice are only distantly related to the common house mouse, Mus musculus. They are endemic to the United States and Mexico. The southern grasshopper mouse has around a 3.5 to 5.0 inches (8.9–12.7 cm) long body and a tail that is generally 1.0 to 2.5 inches (2.5–6.4 cm) long. Its behavior is distinct from other mice.

It is a carnivorous rodent, preying on insects (such as grasshoppers), worms, spiders, centipedes, scorpions, snakes, and even other mice. It also stalks its prey in the manner of a cat, sneaking up quietly, and defends its territory by "howling" like a small wolf. The grasshopper mouse is known to be immune to various venoms released by its prey (scorpions, snakes, etc.). Grasshopper mice are nocturnal and avoid exposure to bright light.

== Ecology ==
=== Diet ===
Grasshopper mice prey on highly venomous arthropods. One example is centipedes that normally kill less resistant mice by injecting deadly toxins through their venomous forcipules. Grasshopper mice move swiftly, while centipedes can only inject their toxin if their prey is held by the centipede's needle-sharp claws. The mouse is agile enough to stay out of the reach of the centipede's claws. The mouse attacks by repeatedly biting through the centipede's hard exoskeleton. Each attack on the centipede damages its central nervous system, until the centipede is paralyzed and the grasshopper mouse can eat it safely.

Another example of a venomous arthropod is the bark scorpion (Centruroides sculpturatus). The grasshopper mouse survives in the deserts of southwest United States by feeding on the bark scorpion, which are plentiful, due to other resources being less common.

Their aggressive nature extends beyond their hunting habits: when held in captivity with other mice, they will often kill and eat those other mice. However, they have a disadvantage when it involves capturing in open areas because of their short legs and wide bodies (which reduces their speed). Due to their ability to maneuver well, they are able to move quickly in narrow areas allowing them to capture their prey more efficiently.

== Physiology ==
=== Pain tolerance ===
The bark scorpion and the grasshopper mouse have been coevolving with each other so closely that it has affected their physiology. The scorpion uses its stinger to inject toxins into the nervous and muscle tissues which causes disruption in the animal's sensory system. However, as the scorpion's stinger evolves to become more toxic, the mice evolve in order to cope with the toxins. Grasshopper mice have evolved sensory neurons which reject the toxins and prevent pain signals. Researchers now know that the grasshopper mouse barely notices the intensifying sting due to a mutation in the cellular pathway that controls their pain response. Compared to the normal house mouse, the grasshopper mouse has one more amino acid in the protein making up the sodium channel Na+ nav1.8. This change prevents the mouse from processing Na+ currents when injected with the scorpion's venom, which blocks action potential propagation and induces analgesia. The grasshopper mouse's mutation may potentially yield better analgesics for humans as well, through further research.

=== Communication ===
Onychomys have six different vocalization types (two neonatal and four adult). They have a wide range of calls that can distinguish them between species, sex, and individuals. For example, the larger mice tend to have deeper voices. When they feel attacked, they will let out a rapid screech/bark.

== Species ==
- Mearns's grasshopper mouse or Chihuahuan grasshopper mouse Onychomys arenicola
- Northern grasshopper mouse, Onychomys leucogaster
- Southern grasshopper mouse, Onychomys torridus
