= Baeodon =

Scientific classification
- Kingdom: Animalia
- Phylum: Chordata
- Class: Mammalia
- Order: Chiroptera
- Family: Vespertilionidae
- Genus: Baeodon; Miller, 1906

Type species
- Baeodon alleni Thomas, 1892

Species
- See text

Genus of bats

Allen's yellow bat

Baeodon is a genus of vesper bats. It consists of two species:

- Allen's yellow bat, Baeodon alleni
- Slender yellow bat, Baeodon gracilis

Baeodon was described as a new genus in 1906 by American zoologist Gerrit Smith Miller Jr. The type species for the genus is Allen's yellow bat, which was previously in the genus Rhogeessa. Later studies found that the slender yellow bat was the sister taxon of Allen's yellow bat.
