= Tiny yellow bat =

Conservation status
- Vulnerable (IUCN 3.1)

Scientific classification
- Kingdom: Animalia
- Phylum: Chordata
- Class: Mammalia
- Order: Chiroptera
- Family: Vespertilionidae
- Genus: Rhogeessa
- Species: R. minutilla

Binomial name
- Rhogeessa minutilla Miller, 1897
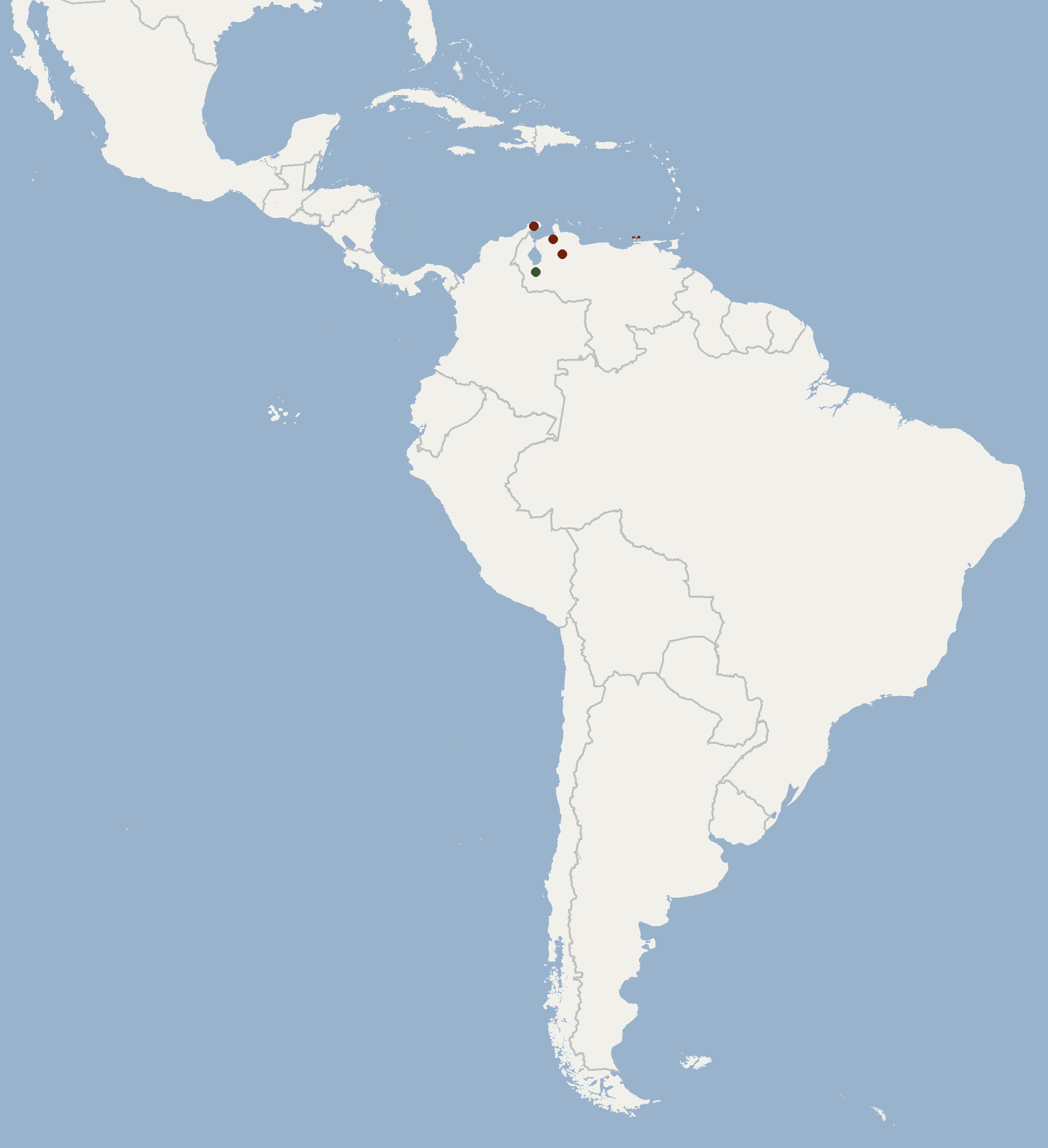

Species of bat

The tiny yellow bat (Rhogeessa minutilla) is a species of vesper bat. It is found in Colombia and Venezuela.
