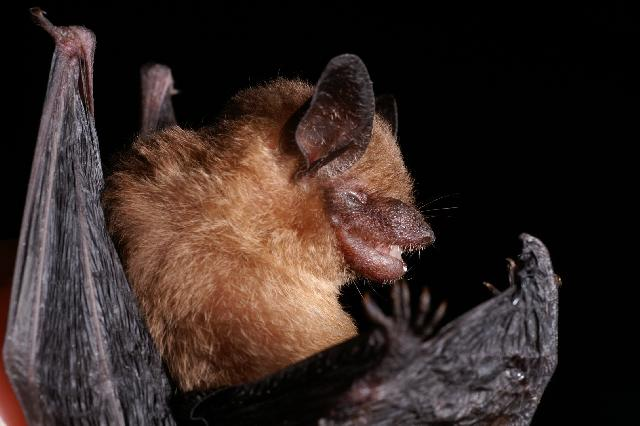
- Rhogeessa aenea

Conservation status
- Least Concern (IUCN 3.1)

Scientific classification
- Kingdom: Animalia
- Phylum: Chordata
- Class: Mammalia
- Order: Chiroptera
- Family: Vespertilionidae
- Genus: Rhogeessa
- Species: R. aenea

Binomial name
- Rhogeessa aenea Goodwin, 1958
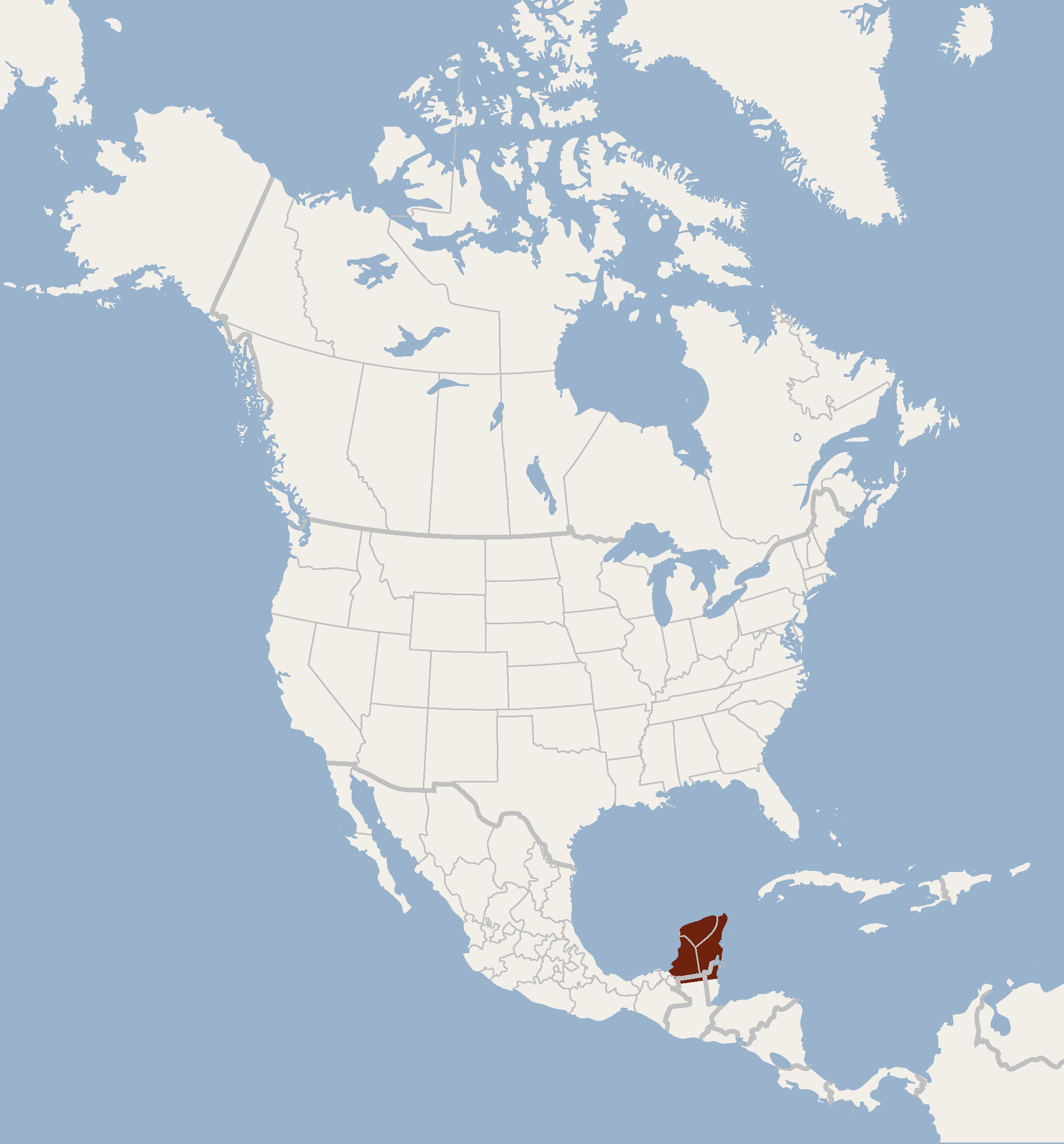

Synonyms
- Rhogeessa aeneus Goodwin, 1958

= Yucatan yellow bat =

Species of bat

The Yucatan yellow bat (Rhogeessa aenea) is a species of bat found in the Yucatán Peninsula in Mexico, and possibly also in Belize and Guatemala. These small insectivorous bats forage on flying insects (most likely mosquitoes) at dawn and dusk.

== Biology ==
Historically, evidence of hybridization between the Yucatan yellow bat and the black-winged little yellow bat has been observed.

== Range and habitat ==
A small population of these bats has been observed on Spanish Lookout Caye, Belize, since at least 1998. They are on both the east and west sides of the mangrove caye, which is located east of Belize City in the Drowned Cayes Range. According to the locals who work on the caye, the bats are thought to roost in the coconut trees during the day.

Rhogeessa spp. on the keys and southern BZE are likely R. tumida, not R. aenea. Surveys on the Yucatan Peninsula in BZE (Ambergris Key) suggest R. tumida is the local species.
