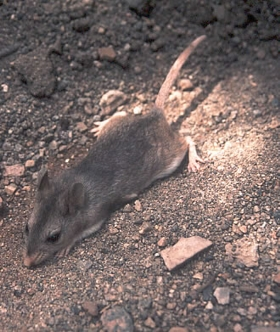

Conservation status
- Least Concern (IUCN 3.1)

Scientific classification
- Kingdom: Animalia
- Phylum: Chordata
- Class: Mammalia
- Order: Rodentia
- Family: Cricetidae
- Subfamily: Neotominae
- Genus: Onychomys
- Species: O. torridus

Binomial name
- Onychomys torridus (Coues, 1874)

= Southern grasshopper mouse =

Species of rodent

The southern grasshopper mouse or scorpion mouse (Onychomys torridus) is a species of predatory rodent in the family Cricetidae, native to Mexico and the states of Arizona, California, Nevada, New Mexico, and Utah in the United States. Notable for its resistance to venom, it routinely preys on the highly venomous Arizona bark scorpion.

== Description ==
The southern grasshopper mouse is a robust, small, nocturnal species that typically forms monogamous pairs. It has a short tail, growing to a total length of 120 to 163 mm (4.7 to 6.4 in). The head, back and sides are pinkish- or grayish-brown while the underparts are white, the two colors being distinctly separated. The tail is club-shaped, short and broad, the anterior part being the same color as the body and the tip being white.

== Biology ==
The southern grasshopper mouse feeds almost entirely on arthropods, such as beetles, grasshoppers and scorpions. In addition to arthropods, it is known to prey upon the little pocket mouse (Perognathus longimembris) and the western harvest mouse (Reithrodontomys megalotis).

In the arid regions inhabited by the southern grasshopper mouse, the Arizona bark scorpion is plentiful and avoided by most predators because of the very painful sting it can inflict. The grasshopper mouse can feed on this scorpion with impunity even when the scorpion stings it repeatedly in the face. Researchers have found that a neural mechanism is involved that blocks the sending of pain messages to the brain. This mouse can normally feel pain from other sources, but can be temporarily insensitive to these stimuli after a dose of venom from a bark scorpion. This pain modulation is activated soon after the scorpion sting; the mouse does briefly feel pain from the sting, but the scorpion venom binds to the transmembrane channel otNav1.8. Specifically, the venom binds to a glutamic acid residue located within the channel protein, thus preventing neuron action potentials from firing and acting as a type of temporary anesthetic and pain reliever for the mouse. When this glutamic acid was replaced with hydrophilic glutamine residue, the venom did not bind with the protein, and the pain modulation ability was lost.

Females are able to produce several litters in a year, but their reproductive life does not usually last into their second year. The average litter size is 2.6 (range 1 to 5), produced after an average gestation period of 29 days. The young are born naked, with pink translucent skin. One day later, the pigment is developing on the dorsal surface and by day ten, hairs 3 millimetres (0.12 in) long are present on the back. The eyes open on day 15 and solid food is being consumed by day 19. The females give birth to their first litter when four or five months old.

== Ecology ==
Southern grasshopper mice are unique among other North American rodents in the family Cricetidae in that their diet consists mostly of arthropods. They are usually found in areas with lower population densities. Several studies have demonstrated that the reproductive attributes of this species allows them to be naturally maintained at lower population densities. Females tend to be sexually active only during one breeding season, which is due to their rapid reproductive aging following their first year. Moreover, males' unique pauses in their testicular activity during the breeding season might also contribute to the lower population densities in which they live.

The natural habitat of southern grasshopper mice include hot, arid valleys, and scrub deserts. A male and female along with their offspring occupy a larger home range for burrowing compared to males and females alone. On average, males have a home range of 7.8 acres (3.2 ha), while females occupy an area of 5.9 acres (2.4 ha). They tend to maintain a specific place of residency for a longer period of time compared to other mammals. The home ranges between southern grasshopper mice are not too far from each other, with an average maximum distance of 118.4 ± 8.0 m (388.5 ± 26.2 ft). However, adult males tend to be very territorial and their efficient spacing is facilitated by vocalizations they make at night.

In a study done by Denise H. Frank and Edward J. Heske, the home range of southern grasshopper mice in the Chihuahuan Desert were observed. The home range of males during the non-breeding season were found to be smaller than those held by males during the breeding season. In contrast, there was not a significant difference between the home ranges of females during the breeding and non-breeding seasons. Male ranges during the reproductive season were some two to three times larger than those of adult females during the reproductive season.

There are no currently known conservation issues associated with southern grasshopper mice, largely due to its wide distribution and tolerance for disturbances caused by arthropods. However, some disturbances have been observed in their low density populations.

== Predatory behavior ==
Southern grasshopper mice are a predatory and very aggressive rodent species. In a study done by Richard McCarty and Charles H. Southwick, these grasshopper mice were deprived of food and their predatory behavior against laboratory mice and crickets was observed. After 48 hours of food deprivation, southern grasshopper mice spent more time eating crickets than the laboratory food they were provided. Live crickets were preferred to deceased specimens, which might suggest that prey movement might be a catalyst and cue for predatory attack. There was no gender related difference in how much time the mice spent feeding on crickets.

Highly aggressive behaviors were displayed towards laboratory mice in the same study, such as biting the back and tail of their prey. After two days of being around the laboratory mice, six of the 43 male grasshopper mice and 22 of the 45 females grasshopper mice killed and ate certain parts of the laboratory mice. This difference in predatory behavior between the male and female grasshopper mice was significant. In their study, both McCarty and Southwick concluded that food deprivation and the type of prey affected the intensity and aggressiveness of the predatory attacks observed by southern grasshopper mice.

== Brain and body size relation ==
Relative brain size tends to vary with food preferences. Brain size is usually smallest in folivores, larger in both granivores and insectivores, and largest in generalists. Measurements of cranial volume of museum specimens of southern grasshopper mouse have shown that on average, females were heavier and longer than males, but their cranial volume was about 3% less than that of males. However, this was not a significant difference. This pattern of brain-body relationship can also be seen in northern grasshopper mice. Moreover, the tail length of southern grasshopper mice made up an average of 33.9% of its body length. Their tail length measures an average of 4.58 ± 0.36 cm (1.80 ± 0.14 in) in females, and 4.50 ± 0.39 cm (1.77 ± 0.15 in) in males. Average tail length does not vary greatly between the sexes.

On average, female southern grasshopper mice are able to deal with a larger body size without increasing their brain size, when compared to males. There is still not enough evidence to explain the difference in body size and brain between males and females. It is possible that there are different demands on both sexes, which might contribute to this difference. These studies were also only done in the laboratory, and there might be sex-specific stresses in their natural habitat that influence brain growth. However, sexual dimorphism is quite common and has been observed in the central nervous system of other mammals.
