= Least yellow bat =

Conservation status
- Vulnerable (IUCN 3.1)

Scientific classification
- Kingdom: Animalia
- Phylum: Chordata
- Class: Mammalia
- Order: Chiroptera
- Family: Vespertilionidae
- Genus: Rhogeessa
- Species: R. mira

Binomial name
- Rhogeessa mira LaVal, 1973
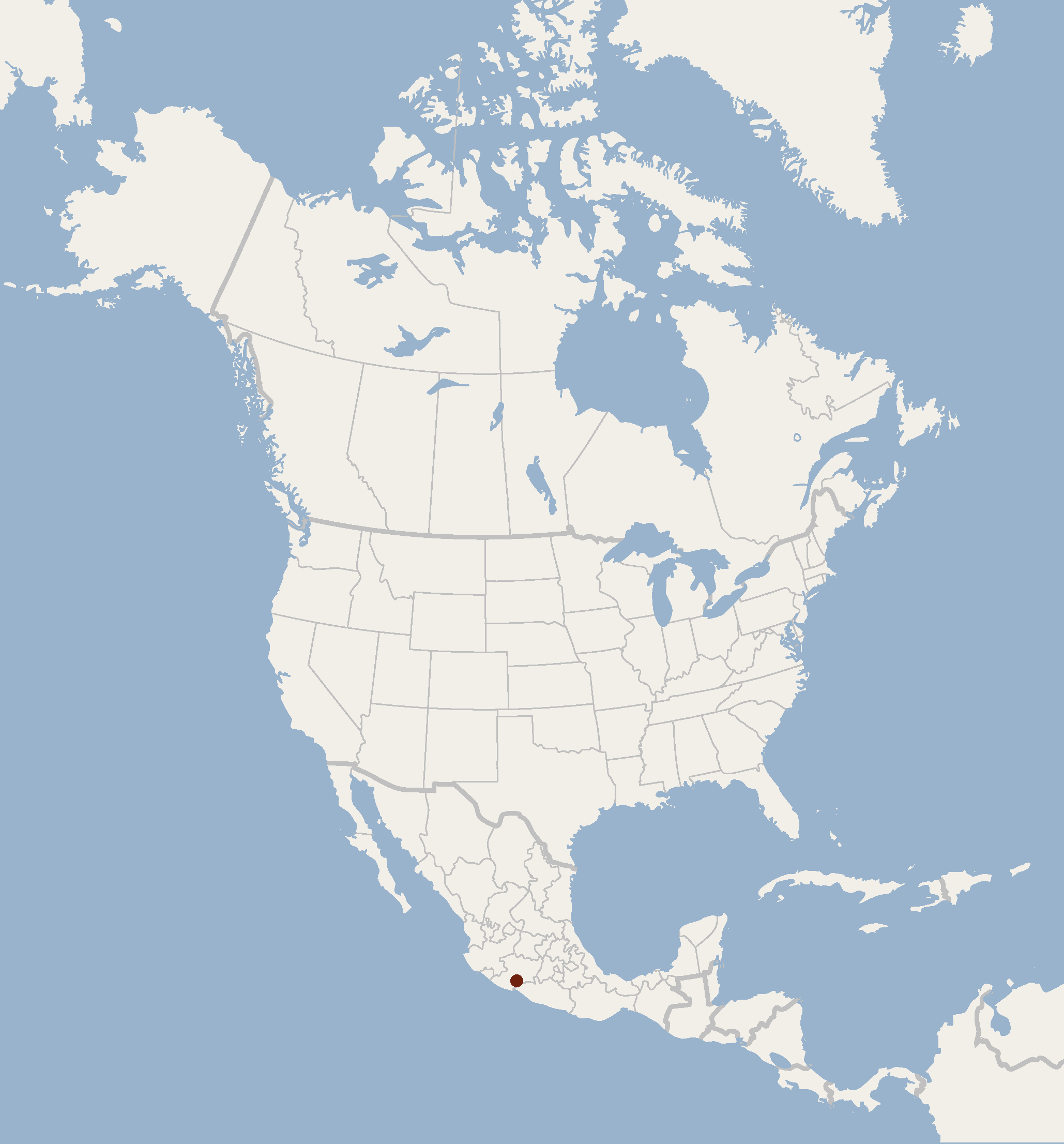

Species of bat found in Mexico

The least yellow bat (Rhogeessa mira) is a species of vesper bat found only in Mexico.
