= Slender yellow bat =

Conservation status
- Least Concern (IUCN 3.1)

Scientific classification
- Domain: Eukaryota
- Kingdom: Animalia
- Phylum: Chordata
- Class: Mammalia
- Order: Chiroptera
- Family: Vespertilionidae
- Genus: Baeodon
- Species: B. gracilis

Binomial name
- Baeodon gracilis Miller, 1897
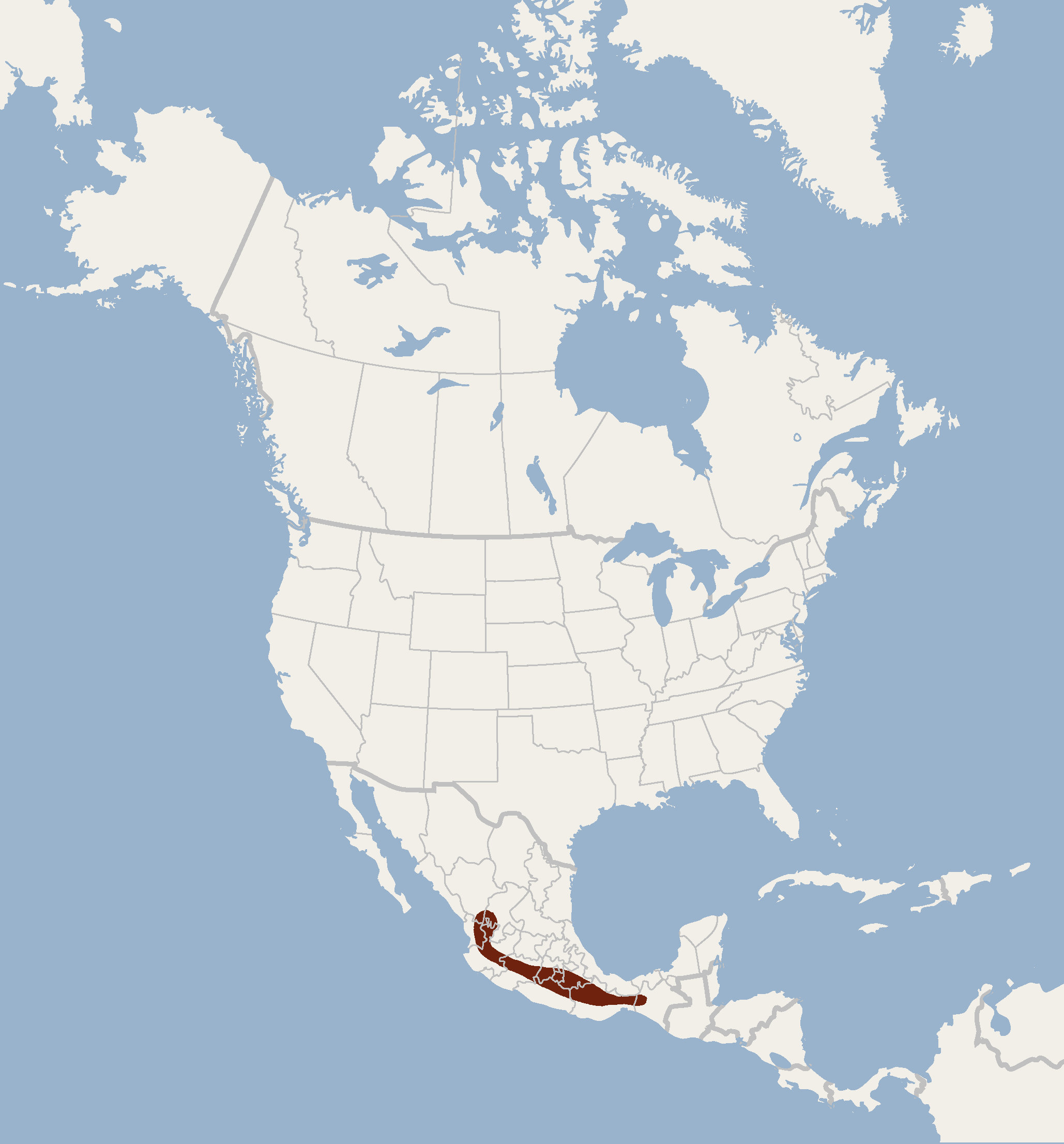

Synonyms
- Rhogeessa gracilis Miller, 1897

Species of bat

The slender yellow bat (Baeodon gracilis) is a species of vesper bat. It is found only in Mexico. It ranges from Jalisco and Zacatecas to Oaxaca states, where it has been found in pine and pine-oak forests, tropical dry forest, and dry shrublands from 600 to 2,000 meters elevation.
