= Allen's yellow bat =

Conservation status
- Least Concern (IUCN 3.1)

Scientific classification
- Kingdom: Animalia
- Phylum: Chordata
- Class: Mammalia
- Order: Chiroptera
- Family: Vespertilionidae
- Genus: Baeodon
- Species: B. alleni

Binomial name
- Baeodon alleni Thomas, 1892

Synonyms
- Rhogeessa alleni Thomas, 1892

Species of bat

Allen's yellow bat (Baeodon alleni) is a species of vesper bat. There is some taxonomic debate surrounding this species, with some authors considering Baeodon a genus rather than a subgenus. It is endemic to Mexico.

== Taxonomy and etymology ==
It was described as a new species in 1892 by British zoologist Oldfield Thomas. Thomas noted that the eponym for the species name "alleni" was Harrison Allen, calling him "the chief authority on North-American bats." In 1906, Gerrit Smith Miller Jr. placed Allen's yellow bat into a newly coined genus, Baeodon. At present, some authors keep Allen's yellow bat as part of Rhogeessa within the subgenus Baeodon, while others believe that it is distinct enough that Baeodon should be considered a monotypic genus rather than a subgenus.

== Description ==
It is a small species of bat, weighing only 5.8–8 g (0.20–0.28 oz). It has large ears, with long tragi. The tragi are rounded at the tips, with a straight or slightly concave inner margin and a slightly convex outer margin. The posterior edges of its wings are white. It has a small and narrow calcar. The head and body is 47 mm (1.9 in), while the tail is 41 mm (1.6 in) long. Its forearm length is 35 mm (1.4 in). Its dental formula is 1.1.1.33.1.2.3 for a total of 30 teeth.

== Range and habitat ==
It is endemic to Mexico, with its range encompassing several states in southwest Mexico. It has been documented at a range of elevations, from 125–1,990 m (410–6,529 ft) above sea level. However, most records of this species are at elevations greater than 1,000 m (3,300 ft) above sea level. Its habitat consists of tropical deciduous forests, thorny forests, deciduous forests, and xeric shrublands.

== Conservation ==
It is currently evaluated as least concern by the IUCN—its lowest conservation priority. However, it is infrequently encountered and is considered rare or locally uncommon.
