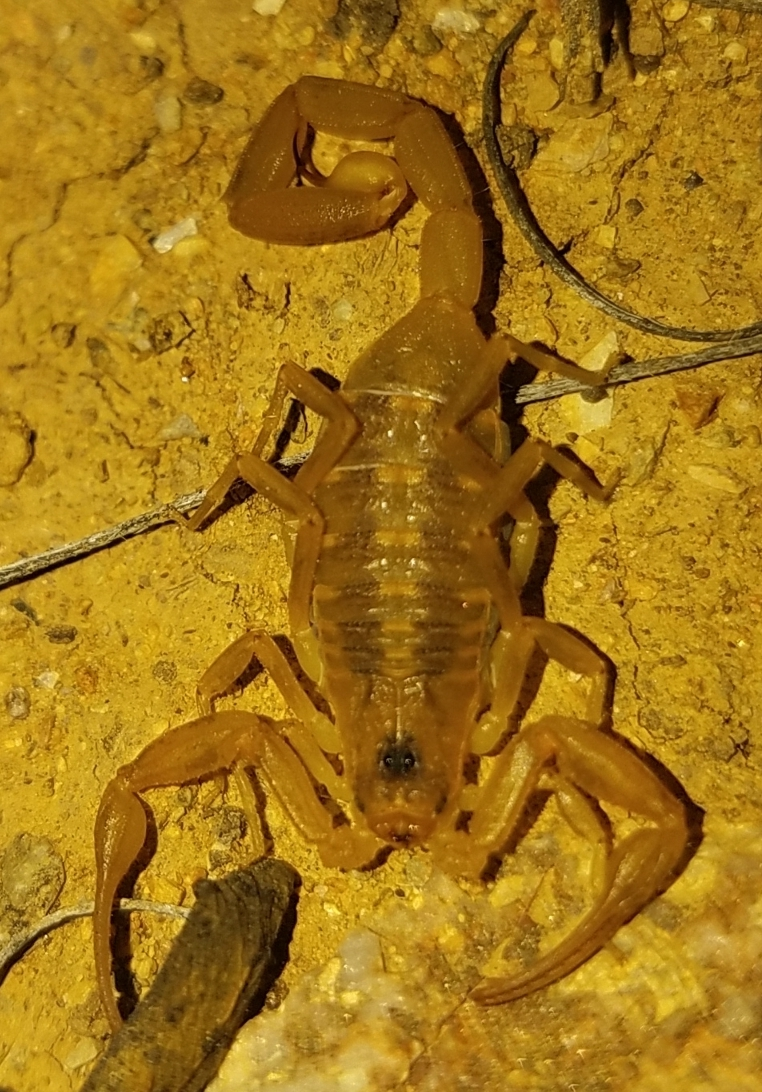

Scientific classification
- Domain: Eukaryota
- Kingdom: Animalia
- Phylum: Arthropoda
- Subphylum: Chelicerata
- Class: Arachnida
- Order: Scorpiones
- Family: Buthidae
- Genus: Centruroides
- Species: C. exilicauda

Binomial name
- Centruroides exilicauda (Wood, 1863)

= Centruroides exilicauda =

Species of scorpion

Centruroides exilicauda, the Baja California bark scorpion, is a species of bark scorpion found in Baja California. It is closely related to the Arizona bark scorpion (Centruroides sculpturatus), but is not considered dangerous. Previously only distinguished by geographic range, the two variants were classified in 1980 as the same species. Subsequently, differences in venom toxicity were recorded, and in 2004, DNA analysis showed them to be separate species. The Baja California bark scorpion is a slender, long-tailed scorpion, and although it is typically sand-colored it appears in darker colors.

== Background ==
The Baja California bark scorpion is a scorpion that belongs to the Centruroides genus and exilicauda species and is one of the 529 species of scorpions around today and one of the 41 bark species of scorpions. They are native to the Western parts of North America, including Baja California, California, Arizona, and New Mexico. They have also been seen around the Colorado River. C. exilicauda ranges in length from 1.5 inches to 3 inches. Their tails are 1/16 of an inch wide. The C. exilicauda exoskeleton can appear in a yellow to light brown to gold color which is ideal for their surrounding environment. There are two main differences that can distinguish the Baja California bark scorpion from other scorpions. First is the subaculear tooth that is at the end of their stinger. Second is the fact that Baja California bark scorpion rest their tails on the ground, as opposed to other scorpions who rest their tail in an arch over their back.

== Ecology ==
The Centruroides genus are carnivorous predators in their ecosystems. Because they feed on the insects that are in their environment, the Centruroides genus plays a key role in regulating the insect population. Centruroides also serve a role as the prey for many larger predators in their ecosystems, such as owls, lizards, snakes, bats, mice, and shrews. Because of the natural environment Centruroides exilicauda lives in, it is not uncommon for them to go without food or water for extended periods of time. Because of this their bodies are adapted to retain nutrients. Scorpions are carnivorous and in the wild will feed on a variety of insects, centipedes, spiders, and other scorpions. In the wild, C. exilicauda will typically feed every two to three days.

== Human interaction ==
Centruroides exilicauda is found throughout Baja California and is native to the United States in three states, California, Arizona, and New Mexico. These scorpions would primarily be found outside during the night time due to them being nocturnal creatures. Centruroides are commonly found burrowed or hidden under rock, bark, or natural caves in the earth. Scorpions have been known to find their way inside of residential houses but this is uncommon and rare due to the Centruroides having poor eyesight. While the Baja California bark scorpion is harder, but not impossible, to come by as a pet, there are many other species of the Centruroides that are commonly available as pets.

== Venom ==
Centruroides exilicauda use venom to hunt by injecting the prey which immobilizes or kills it. Their venom has the potential to be fatal to humans. However, the chances of this happening are low. Each scorpion species’ venom has a unique chromatographic profile, due to genetic factors distinct in each species. The genetic differences in venom are important for determining different species of scorpions since their morphology can be almost indistinguishable. In 2004, the existence of the C. exilicauda species was confirmed when the venom from them and the venom from their close relative, Centruroides sculpturatus, were tested and found to have different toxicity levels. The soluble venom of C. exilicauda and C. sculpturatus were extracted and the amino acid sequences concerning toxins were tested in mice. They showed that the venom from C. exilicauda was a less common medical threat. In humans, the venom of the California bark scorpion may cause difficulty breathing or muscle spasms.

== Habitat ==
The Baja California bark scorpion is often found in cool moist areas, such as creek, stream, or lakeside environments. Centruroides exilicauda commonly hides beneath tree bark, in rock crevices or other ground cover as it shelters from daily heat. Centruroides scorpions are capable of climbing and negative geotaxis, in which they cling upside down to surfaces. This scorpion may be found sheltering in homes or other constructed environments.
