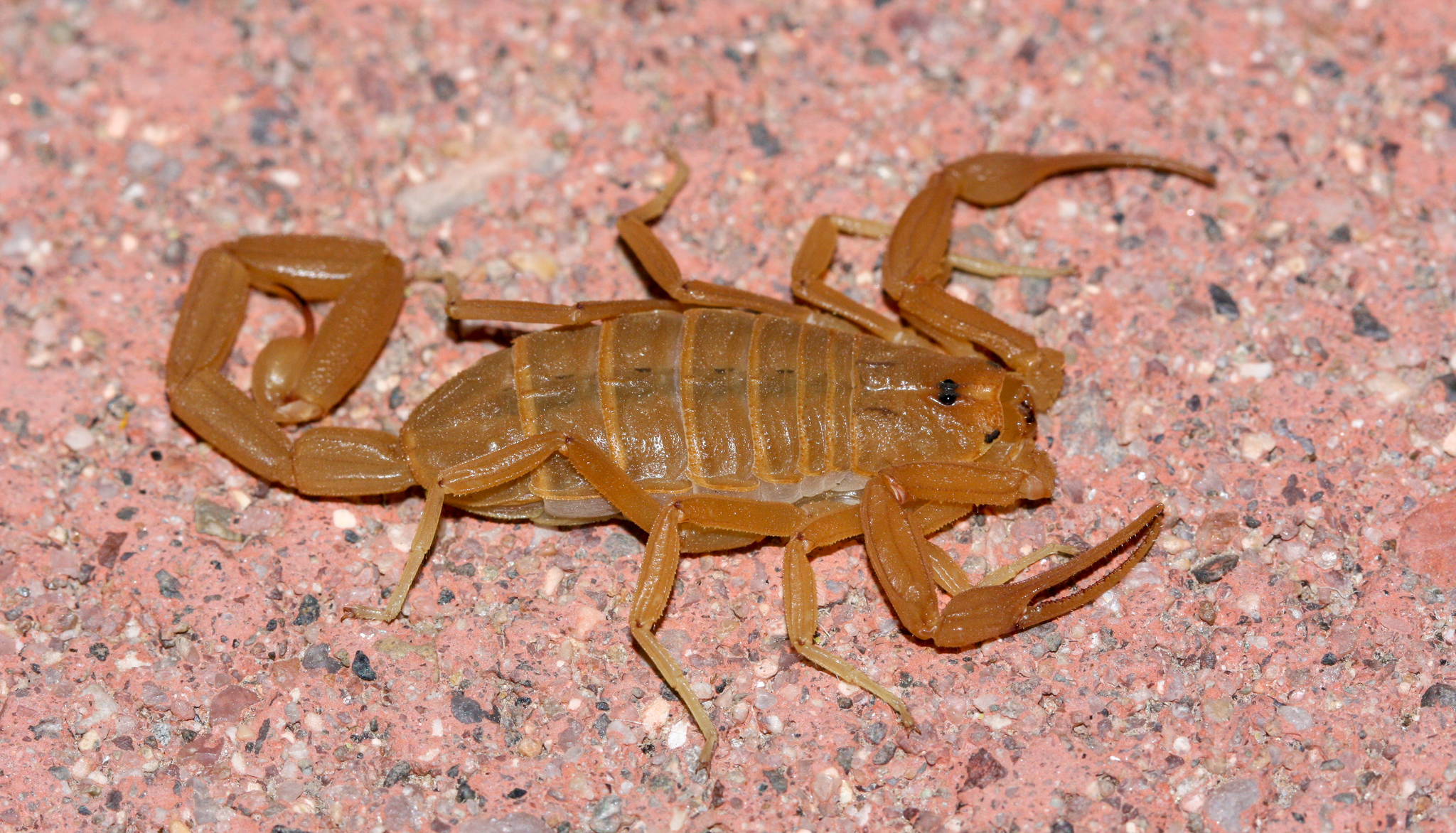
- In Phoenix, Arizona

Scientific classification
- Kingdom: Animalia
- Phylum: Arthropoda
- Subphylum: Chelicerata
- Class: Arachnida
- Order: Scorpiones
- Family: Buthidae
- Genus: Centruroides
- Species: C. sculpturatus

Binomial name
- Centruroides sculpturatus (Wood, 1863)

= Arizona bark scorpion =

Species of scorpion

The Arizona bark scorpion (Centruroides sculpturatus, once included in Centruroides exilicauda) is a small light brown scorpion common to the Sonoran Desert in the southwestern United States and northwestern Mexico. An adult male can reach 8 centimetres (3.1 in) of body length, while a female is slightly smaller, with a maximum length of 7 centimetres (2.8 in).

== Predators ==
Arizona bark scorpions are eaten by a wide variety of animals such as pallid bats, birds (especially owls), reptiles (including snakes), other vertebrates (including peccaries and rodents), spiders, and other scorpions. Development, pesticides and the collecting of scorpions for research or the pet trade also reduces the bark scorpion population.

The painful and potentially deadly venom of Arizona bark scorpions has little effect on grasshopper mice. Scientists have found the scorpion toxin acts as an analgesic rather than a pain stimulant in grasshopper mice.

== Life cycle ==
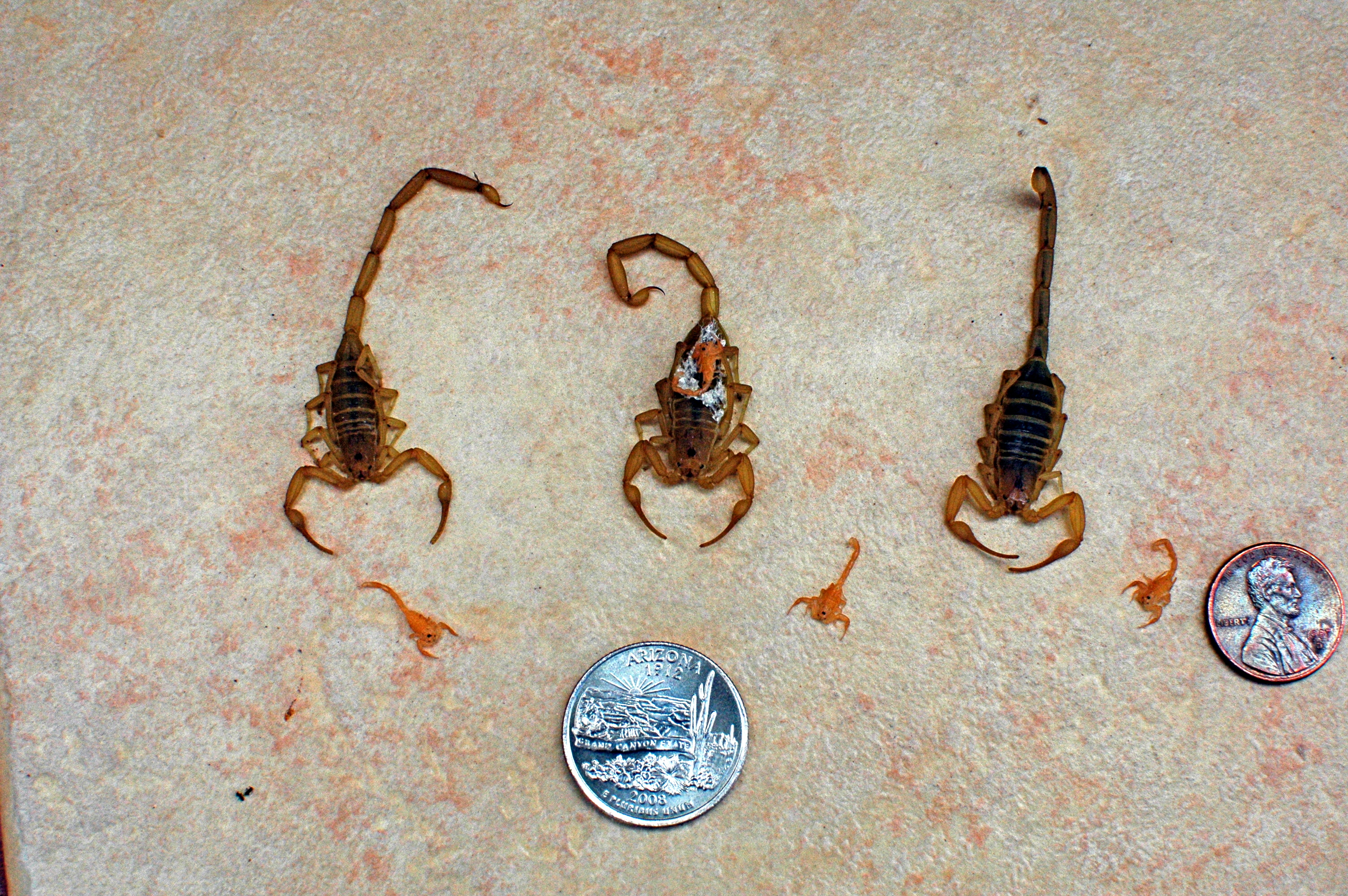
Three adult and four juvenile Arizona bark scorpions

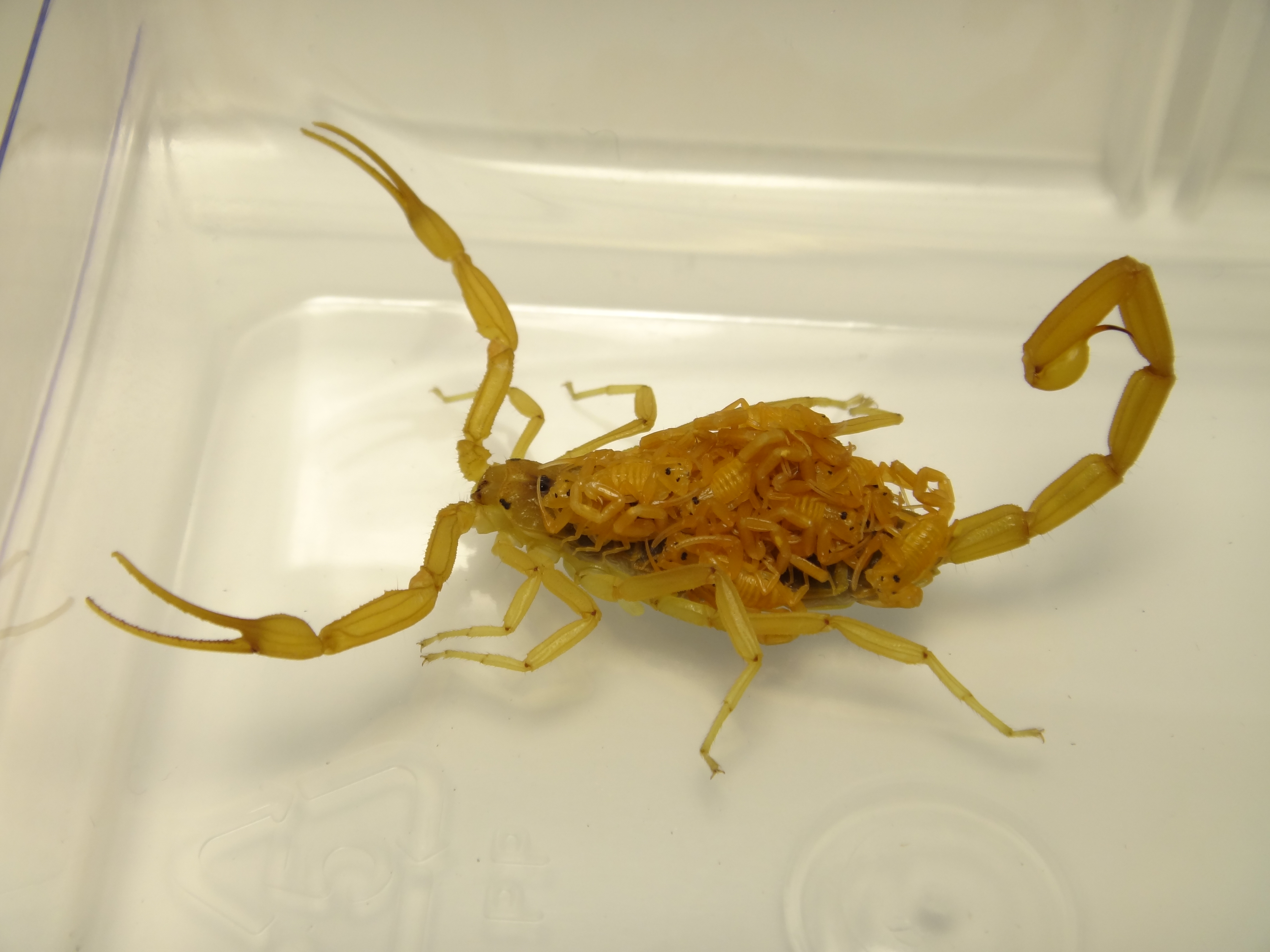
A female Arizona bark scorpion with young

A female Arizona bark scorpion with 20 babies (scorplings) riding on her back, glowing under a blacklight enganged in the mating dance with a male.

Arizona bark scorpions have a gestation period of several months, are born live, and are gently guided onto their mother's back. The female usually gives birth to anywhere from 25 to 35 young. These remain with their mother until their first molt, which can be up to three weeks after birth. Arizona bark scorpions have a life expectancy of about six years.

Arizona bark scorpions, like most other scorpions, are incredibly resilient. During American nuclear tests scorpions (along with cockroaches and lizards) were found near ground zero with no recorded adverse effects.

== Habitat ==
The Arizona bark scorpion is nocturnal, and particularly well adapted to the desert: layers of wax on its exoskeleton make it resistant to water loss. Nevertheless, Arizona bark scorpions hide during the heat of the day, typically under rocks, wood piles, or tree bark. Arizona bark scorpions do burrow, and are commonly found in homes, requiring a gap of only 1/16 of an inch wide for entry.

Arizona bark scorpions prefer riparian areas with mesquite, cottonwood, and sycamore groves, all of which have sufficient moisture and humidity to support insects and other prey species. The popularity of irrigated lawns, and other systems which increase environmental humidity in residential areas, has led to a massive increase in the number of these animals in some areas.

Centruroides scorpions are unusual in that they are the only genus in the Southwest that can climb walls, trees, and other objects with a sufficiently rough surface. Arizona bark scorpions practice negative geotaxis, preferring an upside down orientation, which often results in people being stung due to the scorpion being on the underside of an object.

The Arizona bark scorpion preys on small and medium-sized animals such as beetles, spiders, crickets, cockroaches, other insects and other scorpions.

The range of the Arizona bark scorpion is from southern California, southern Arizona, southern Nevada, extreme southwestern Utah and western New Mexico. They are also found in Baja California, Sonora and Chihuahua, Mexico.

== Venom ==
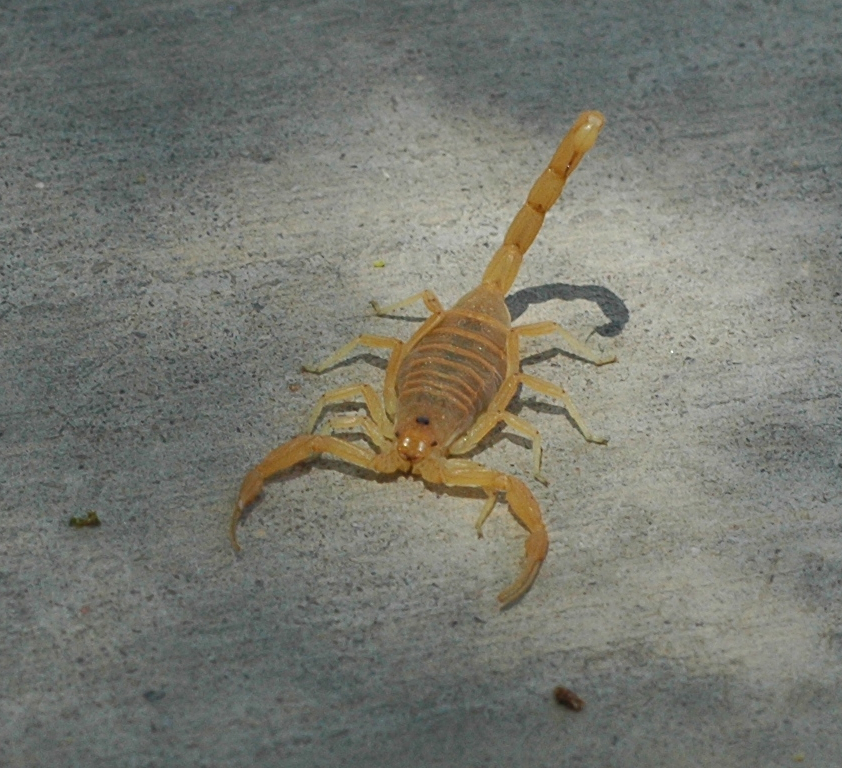
Frontal view of an Arizona bark scorpion in a defensive posture

The Arizona bark scorpion is the most venomous scorpion in the United States, and its venom can cause severe pain (coupled with numbness, tingling, and vomiting) in adult humans, typically lasting between 24 and 72 hours. Temporary dysfunction in the area stung is common; e.g. a hand or possibly arm can be immobilized or experience convulsions. It also may cause shortness of breath for a short time. Due to the extreme pain induced, many victims describe sensations of electrical jolts after envenomation. Two recorded fatalities have occurred in the state of Arizona since 1968; the number of victims stung each year in Arizona and New Mexico is estimated to be in the thousands.

=== Antivenom ===
An antivenom was developed for this species at Arizona State University by Dr. Herbert L. Stahnke, and produced in quantities sufficient to treat individuals within the state of Arizona. This antivenom was not FDA approved, but use within the state of Arizona was allowable and very successful in shortening the duration of symptoms and hospitalization. Production of this antivenom ceased by 2000 and the product was unavailable by 2004. A Mexican-produced antivenom, Anascorp [Antivenin Centruroides (scorpion) F(ab′)_{^{2}}, Laboratorios Silanes, Instituto Bioclon SA de CV], received FDA approval on August 3, 2011, and is now in use.

=== First aid ===
Basic first aid measures can be used to help mediate Arizona bark scorpion stings:

- Clean sting site with soap and water
- Apply a cool compress (cool cloth)
- Take acetaminophen (paracetamol) or ibuprofen for local pain and swelling

Arizona poison control centers suggest immediate medical attention if severe symptoms occur, particularly in young children.

== UV lighting ==
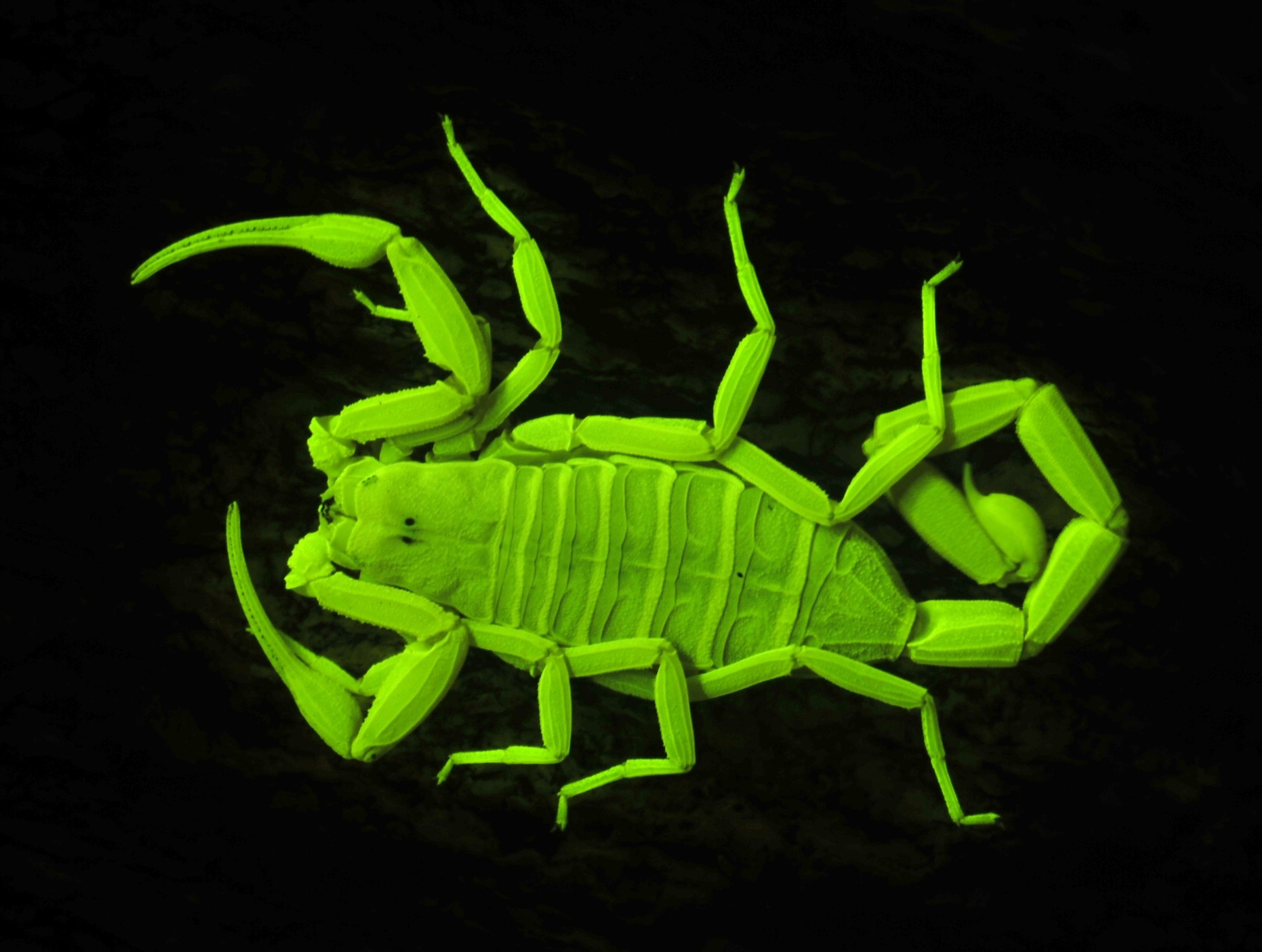
Arizona bark scorpion fluorescing under ultraviolet light

Arizona bark scorpions, like most other scorpions, will fluoresce when exposed to a blacklight. This is particularly useful in scorpion detection, since Arizona bark scorpions are active during the night, and can be easily spotted using this method. Typical UV LED flashlights enable the detection of Arizona bark scorpions at a distance of approximately six feet. Newly molted Arizona bark scorpions will not fluoresce under ultraviolet light for a few days after molting.

== Control and prevention ==
Arizona bark scorpions are tan or light beige tone in color and very small, making them difficult to detect especially on natural terrain (rocky land, multiple vegetation and soil textured land). They often look for places to hide, and they will not seek out humans unless provoked or defending young. Several methods of control have historically been used to control Arizona bark scorpions, such as physical barriers (scorpions are unable to climb smooth surfaces), pesticides, glue boards, and removing any scorpion congregation areas in the vicinity of the building.
