= Robert James Baker =

Robert James Baker (8 April 1942–30 March 2018) was an American mammalogist. He studied bats, as well as the effects of radiation on animals.

== Early life and education ==
Robert James Baker was born on 8 April 1942 in Warren, Arkansas to parents Laura Cooper and James Simeon Baker, who was killed during World War II. His mother subsequently remarried, and he grew up with six half-siblings. In 1959 he began attending college at Ouachita Baptist University, though he soon transferred, graduating from University of Arkansas at Monticello in 1963. He graduated from Oklahoma State University with his M.S. in 1965 and from University of Arizona with his PhD.

== Awards and honors ==
In 1979, Baker received the Paul Whitfield Horn Professor Award from Texas Tech University, which is its highest honor. In 1980 he received the C. Hart Merriam Award from the American Society of Mammalogists.

== Personal life ==
He married Jean Joyner on 19 August 1961, with one daughter resulting from this marriage. The marriage ended in divorce in 1975. On 28 May 1978, he married Laura Kyle, to whom he was married for thirty-eight years. The couple had one son.
