= List of mammals of New Caledonia =

This is a list of the wild mammal species recorded in New Caledonia. There are eighteen mammal species in New Caledonia, of which one is critically endangered, three are endangered, four are vulnerable, one is near threatened, four are least concern, and five are data deficient.

The following tags are used to highlight each species' conservation status as assessed by the International Union for Conservation of Nature:

EX	Extinct	No reasonable doubt that the last individual has died.
EW	Extinct in the wild	Known only to survive in captivity or as a naturalized populations well outside its previous range.
CR	Critically endangered	The species is in imminent risk of extinction in the wild.
EN	Endangered	The species is facing an extremely high risk of extinction in the wild.
VU	Vulnerable	The species is facing a high risk of extinction in the wild.
NT	Near threatened	The species does not meet any of the criteria that would categorise it as risking extinction but it is likely to do so in the future.
LC	Least concern	There are no current identifiable risks to the species.
DD	Data deficient	There is inadequate information to make an assessment of the risks to this species.

== Order: Sirenia (manatees and dugongs) ==
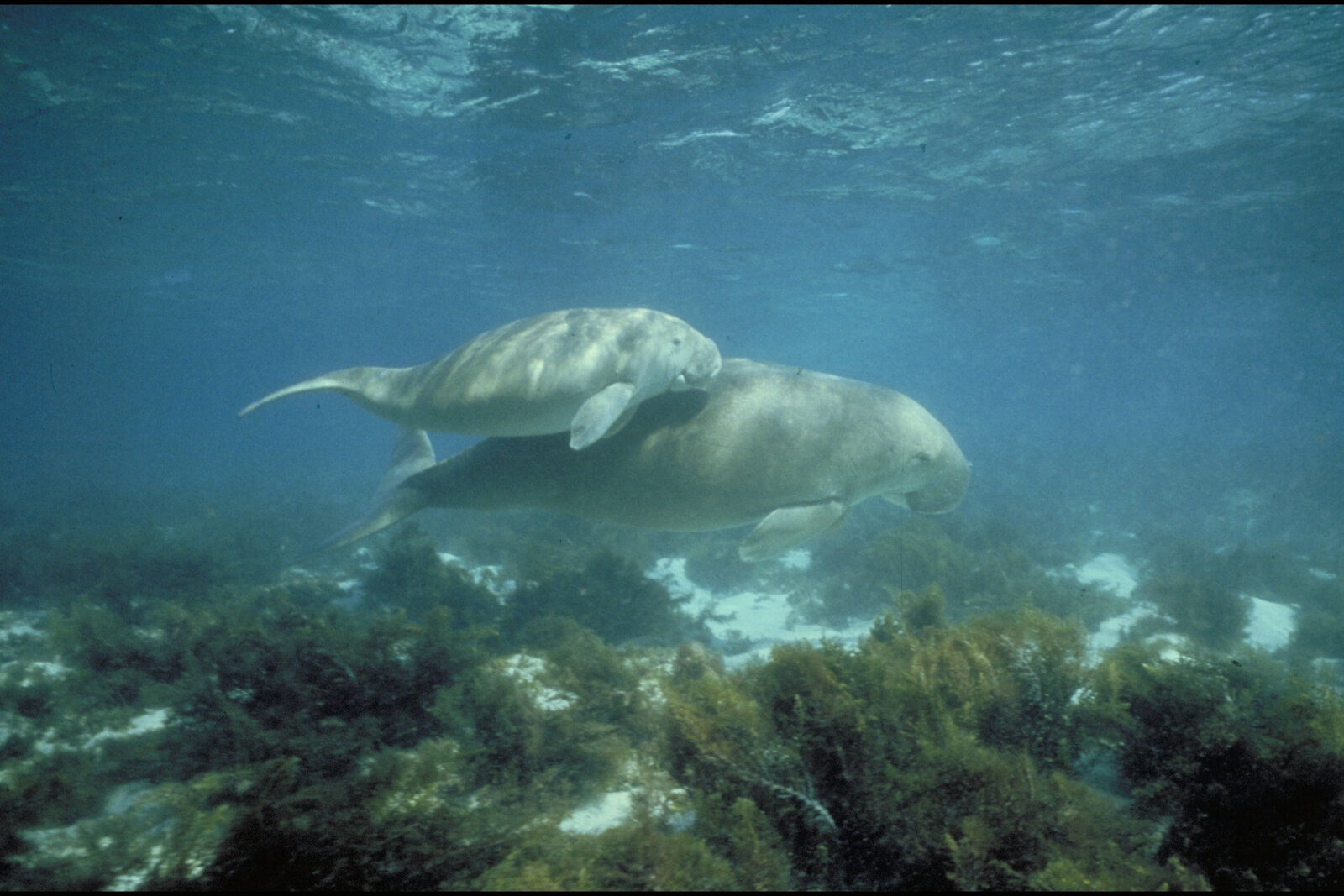
Dugongs

Sirenia is an order of fully aquatic, herbivorous mammals that inhabit rivers, estuaries, coastal marine waters, swamps, and marine wetlands. All four species are endangered.

- Family: Dugongidae
    - Genus: Dugong
      - Dugong, Dugong dugon VU

== Order: Chiroptera (bats) ==
The bats' most distinguishing feature is that their forelimbs are developed as wings, making them the only mammals capable of flight. Bat species account for about 20% of all mammals.

- Family: Pteropodidae (flying foxes, Old World fruit bats)
  - Subfamily: Pteropodinae
    - Genus: Pteropus
      - Ornate flying fox, Pteropus ornatus VU
      - Insular flying-fox, Pteropus tonganus LC
      - New Caledonia flying fox, Pteropus vetulus NT
  - Subfamily: Macroglossinae
    - Genus: Notopteris
      - Long-tailed fruit bat, Notopteris macdonaldi VU
      - New Caledonia blossom bat, Notopteris neocaledonica EN
- Family: Vespertilionidae
  - Subfamily: Vespertilioninae
    - Genus: Chalinolobus
      - New Caledonia wattled bat, Chalinolobus neocaledonicus EN
    - Genus: Nyctophilus
      - New Caledonian long-eared bat, Nyctophilus nebulosus CR
  - Subfamily: Miniopterinae
    - Genus: Miniopterus
      - Loyalty bent-winged bat, Miniopterus robustior EN
      - Little bent-wing bat, Miniopterus australis LC

== Order: Cetacea (whales) ==
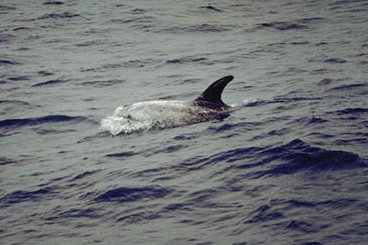
Risso's dolphin

The order Cetacea includes whales, dolphins and porpoises. They are the mammals most fully adapted to aquatic life with a spindle-shaped nearly hairless body, protected by a thick layer of blubber, and forelimbs and tail modified to provide propulsion underwater.

- Suborder: Mysticeti
  - Family: Balaenopteridae
    - Subfamily: Megapterinae
      - Genus: Megaptera
        - Humpback whale, Megaptera novaeangliae VU
- Suborder: Odontoceti
  - Superfamily: Platanistoidea
    - Family: Kogiidae
      - Genus: Kogia
        - Dwarf sperm whale, Kogia sima LC
    - Family: Ziphidae
      - Subfamily: Hyperoodontinae
        - Genus: Mesoplodon
          - Blainville's beaked whale, Mesoplodon densirostris DD
          - Ginkgo-toothed beaked whale, Mesoplodon ginkgodens DD
          - Hector's beaked whale, Mesoplodon hectori DD
    - Family: Delphinidae (marine dolphins)
      - Genus: Delphinus
        - Short-beaked common dolphin, Delphinus delphis LC
      - Genus: Feresa
        - Pygmy killer whale, Feresa attenuata DD
      - Genus: Grampus
        - Risso's dolphin, Grampus griseus DD
      - Genus: Stenella
        - Pantropical spotted dolphin, Stenella attenuata LC
        - Spinner dolphin, Stenella longirostris LC
      - Genus: Tursiops
        - Indo-Pacific bottlenose dolphin, Tursiops aduncus NT
        - Common bottlenose dolphin, Tursiops truncatus LC

== See also ==
- List of chordate orders
- Lists of mammals by region
- List of prehistoric mammals
- Mammal classification
- List of mammals described in the 2000s
