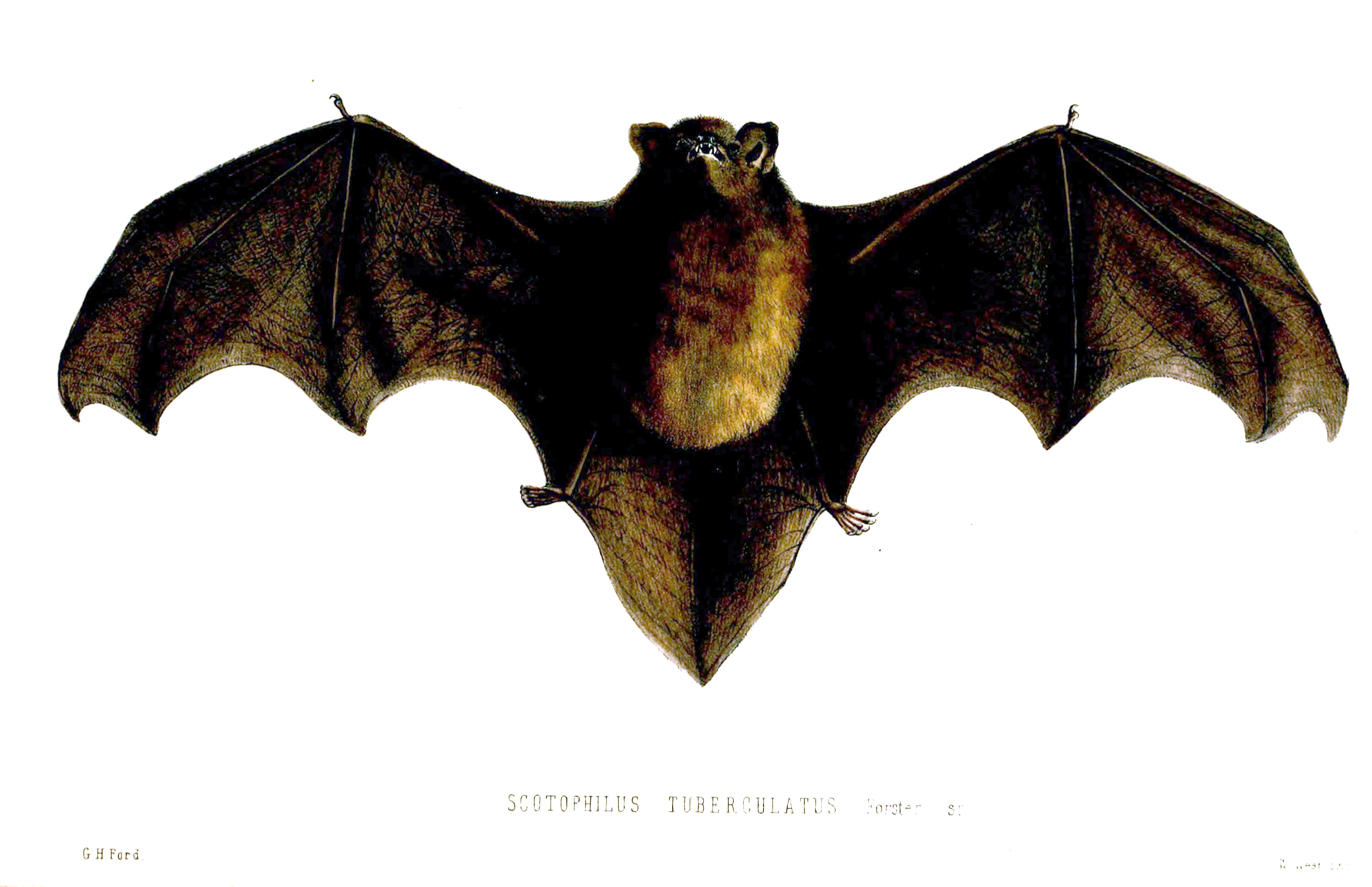

Conservation status
- Critically Endangered (IUCN 3.1)

- Nationally Critical (NZ TCS)

Scientific classification
- Kingdom: Animalia
- Phylum: Chordata
- Class: Mammalia
- Order: Chiroptera
- Family: Vespertilionidae
- Genus: Chalinolobus
- Species: C. tuberculatus

Binomial name
- Chalinolobus tuberculatus (Forster, 1844)

= New Zealand long-tailed bat =

Species of bat

Chalinolobus tuberculatus, known more commonly as the New Zealand long-tailed bat, the long-tailed wattle bat or pekapeka tou-roa, is a small insectivorous mammal within the genus Chalinolobus. The long-tailed bat is one of 7 species belonging to the genus Chalinolobus, which are commonly referred to as "wattled bats," "pied bats" and "long-tailed bats." The genus Chalinolobus is characterised by fleshy lobes located on their lower lips and at the bottom of their ears. Some zoologists claim there is overlap between the Chalinolobus genus and the Glauconycteris genus.

The long-tailed bat is one of two extant and three total terrestrial mammals endemic to the islands of New Zealand, the other extant species being the New Zealand lesser short-tailed bat (Mystacina tuberculata). The long-tailed bat is closely related to 6 other species of wattled bats found in Australasia, namely Gould's wattled bat (Chalinolobus gouldi), the largest of the species belonging to the Chalinolobus genus. The long-tailed bat won the 2021 Bird of the Year competition in New Zealand, despite not being a bird.

== Taxonomy and evolution ==
=== Taxonomic classification ===
Chalinolobus tuberculatus are members of the suborder Yangochiroptera within the family Vespertilionidae which contains four subfamilies; Vespertilioninae, Murininae, Myotinae and Kerivoulinae. Within the subfamily Vespertilioninae is the tribe Vespertilionini, which is where the Chalinolobus genus is found. Within the Chalinolobus genus, there are 7 species: C. gouldii, C. morio, C. dwyeri, C. picatus, C. neocaldonicus, C. nigrogriseus and C. tuberculatus. There is minor debate regarding their taxonomic position, with some zoologists claiming that the 13 species classified in the genus Glauconycteris should actually belong to the Chalinolobus genus.

=== Evolutionary history ===
The family Vespertilionidae, likely diverged from the family Molossidae during the Eocene around 50 million years ago. Vesper bats are an incredibly diverse family with 59 genera, and would have faced extensive radiation shortly after their emergence. Chalinolobus is predominantly found in Oceania, a geographic region which includes Australasia, Melanesia, Polynesia and Micronesia. The evolutionary history of the Chalinolobus genus is likely attributed to the biogeographical changes that occurred in this region. Genetic data indicates that Chalinolobus is very closely related to other genera within the Vespertilionidae family, many of which are also found in Oceania. Divergence from these related genera is believed to have occurred in the Miocene, a significant time of environmental and climatic changes. This era coincided with the development of Australia's arid environment, which contrasts vastly when New Zealand's dense forest ecosystems. The diversification of species within the Chalinolobus genus likely took place between 5 and 10 million years ago, driven by the need to adapt to the differing environments found throughout Oceania.

== Distribution and range ==
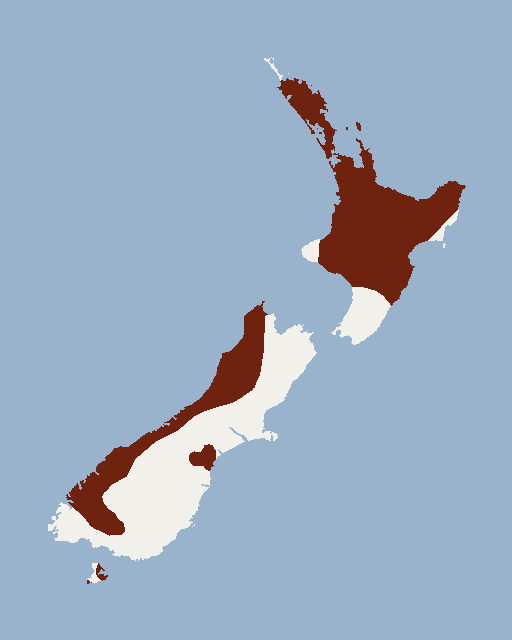
Distribution of C. tuberculatus in New Zealand

The long-tailed bat is becoming incredibly rare in New Zealand, and is currently considered to be nationally critical. However, they have a very widespread, patchy distribution. There are populations on both of the main islands, as well as on Stewart Island, Little Barrier Island, Great Barrier Island and Kapiti Island. There is a negative relationship between the abundance of this species and urbanisation, and as of 2024, they are considered extinct in urban habitats. One of the few main populations reside in Eglinton Valley, Fiordland, this core population is where sightings are often recorded. The long-tailed bat have very large home ranges of up to 20 km in radius.

== Anatomy and physiology ==
The long-tailed bat is very small, illustrating their relation to microbats. The typical weight for this species is between 8 and 12g, however this can increase to ~16g during pregnancy and 12.5g during lactation. During a successful period of foraging, the weight can increase a further 3g, however, the original weight will be returned to by dawn. Their body length is comparable to a human thumb, around 5–6 cm, however, the wingspan usually sits at 30 cm. For a bat this size, this is considered to be medium wing loading and a medium aspect ratio, which is typical for bats that forage along forest edges. Hence its name, the long-tailed bat has a long tail connected by a patygium to its hind legs, this distinguishes it from the short-tailed bat. The fur of the long-tailed bat is variable, with females often having chestnut colours and white tips on the fur. Males and juveniles are darker, with near blackish fur. In both sexes, the under layer of fur is pale brown and the wings are essentially hairless.

== Foraging and diet ==
=== Preferred foods ===
The long-tailed bat is solely insectivorous, with faeces samples suggesting both terrestrial and aquatic invertebrates. The more common insect groups found to be consumed by this species are Diptera, Coleoptera and Lepidoptera. In general, flies (Diptera) are their most significant source of food, however, they are an insectivorous generalist, meaning they will consume whichever insects are readily abundant in their habitat. Moths (Lepidoptera), are the most common insect consumed during warmer months, and due to the size of these insects, it is a very nutritious capture. Flies, including crane flies and midges, are key when the habitat of a bat is around a body of water or a wetland.

=== Foraging methods ===
The long-tailed bat is a very quick, agile insectivore. It primarily carries out two methods of foraging; aerial hawking and gleaning. Aerial hawking involves capturing and consuming aerial insects whilst in flight. They are known to forage primarily over bodies of water and forest edges, close to the water or ground which allows for effective access to flying insects. Gleaning is a method in which the bat will directly retrieve an insect from a surface, this is useful when targeting slower moving insects. They are nocturnal and therefore will begin foraging activities between 14 and 30 minutes after sunset and will continue into the late night. In general, the long-tailed bat will spend 68.3% of the night actively foraging. The Fiordland population will often begin foraging 54 minutes before sunset, this came as a result of temperature and invertebrate abundance declining. The minimum temperature will determine whether the bats fly at night, and invertebrate presence determines how long they search for. In winter, the long-tailed bat becomes less active as insect availability becomes less and temperature drops. The lowest recorded temperature that the long-tailed bat has been recorded to forage at is -1.5 °C, lower than this is where torpor becomes important.

=== Echolocation ===
Echolocation used to access prey

Like most species of bat, the long-tailed bat uses echolocation for navigating and foraging for food. This involves the emission of rapid pulses of high frequency sounds which they can then detect the echoes of when it hits objects nearby. The echolocation call of the long-tailed bat reaches a peak amplitude of 28 kHz, and the call duration is on average 6.3ms. These calls are typical of forest edge foragers. Echolocation is incredibly important for aerial hawkers, as it allows them to navigate the exact position of their prey. The echoes do not work as efficiently when foraging on the ground due to disruptions from the forest floor and previous echoes bouncing back and interrupting new echoes. This causes confusion for the bats and explains the evolution of aerial hawking in this species, as the sound can travel more distance and has less objects present to disrupt the signal.

== Roosting and torpor behaviours ==
=== Roosting ===
Roosting is a behaviour carried out by the long-tailed bat which essentially involves an individual bat or group of bats finding a cavity and using it for predator protection, energy conservation, body heat regulation and birthing and rearing. It is essentially the location where a bat will reside when it is not flying. These cavities often are hollow tree stumps, in the ferns of trees, caves, fractures in rocks or under the bark of trees. The long-tailed bat roosts either individually or in a group. In the North Island, around 37.3% of bats engage in solitary roosting, whereas 62.7% are communal. In the South Island, 70% are solitary and 30% are communal. At communal roost sites, there has been recorded numbers of anywhere between 34 and 86 bats roosting at a single time. However, it is incredibly difficult to ascertain this number as the bats are very mobile, so this is most likely an underestimation.

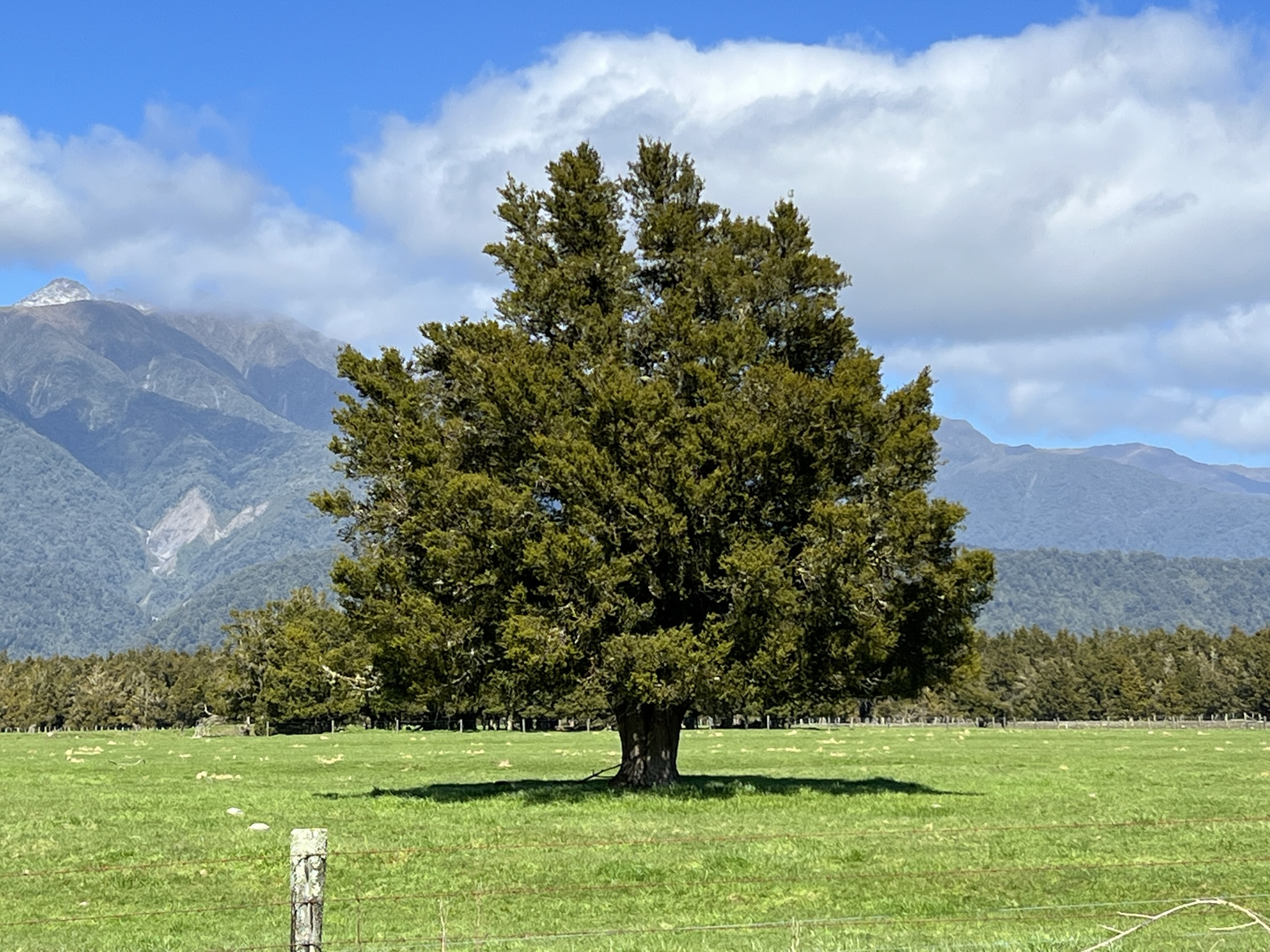
Podocarpus totara

Roost site selection often is based upon the characteristics of trees, the composition of the forest, the selection of insects and the topography. The long-tailed bat has a preference for native trees such as the NZ cabbage tree (Cordyline australis), kānuka (Kunzea ericoides), and tōtara (Podocarpus totara). 95% of trees used reside in open-structured and lowland forests with the forest edge at least 500m away. ~30% of the trees used for roosting are dead trees that are still standing.

Bats of every genus roost, yet for the long-tailed bat this behaviour is slightly different. The movement to different roosting sites is very frequent, and often a group or individual will not occupy a roosting site for more than one night. This species also does not cycle between a selection of roosts, almost every night it will be an entirely new site. The young will be moved and each individual from a group will move at the same time. This is likely due to predator risk. Individuals of the long-tailed bat species will frequently move between being communal and being solitary in their roosting behaviour. Reproductive females usually remain in a communal roost during lactation, but move to a solitary roost post-lactation. This species also has different roosts for the night and the day. The night roosts are often positioned in areas where food is more readily accessible. The day roosting sites are the location where torpor takes place.

=== Torpor ===
As a result of the very variable and seasonally influenced source of nutrition for this species, the adaptation of entering a state of torpor is incredibly important. The fluctuating body temperature and high rate of metabolism observed in this species means that they need to be able to enter this state during cold, wet periods of time. Torpor essentially is an adaptation that involves the bats becoming inactive, and only the essential bodily functions continue. This reduces the amount of energy produced and allows for survival during times of physiological stress. While this process is similar to hibernation in that it involves slowing down the metabolic rate, it differs in that bouts of torpor are short and repetitive. This state can last for a few hours to an entire day. This process is utilised during all seasons, but is prioritised during the colder months. The long-tailed bat males and females enter torpor 80% of the days in a 3 month period while in solitary roosts, and 35% of days in communal roosts. Solitary roosting bats will often remain in this state for 12 hours, where communally roosting bats will only remain in this state for an average of 9 hours.

== Reproduction and lifecycle ==
Males of this species are able to engage in mating behaviours when their epididymides are grey and swollen. Sperm presence begins to occur in late summer which is around the time that mating begins, however, pregnancy does not occur until late spring. Female bats become reproductively active at around 2 years old, and this continues up until they are 9 years old with annual births of a single pup. Female bats will be pregnant for a period of around 6–8 weeks across spring and into early summer. In December, a single infant bat, approximately 1 cm in length will be born. The offspring will be hairless and blind at birth. The mother will feed the pup every 1–3 hours after birth. At 4–5 weeks of development, once the pup reaches at least 7g is will begin flying. The long-tailed bat has a proposed lifespan of around 7–11 years, however it is possible this species could live for 30 years in perfect conditions.

== Social systems and population dynamics ==
Larger populations of these bats usually range between 100 and 350 individuals, however, due to the movement and crossover of population habitats, these numbers are not confirmed. There are also usually sub-populations within larger populations, so differentiating this becomes another issue. In regard to population structure, reproductive females are the most dominant individuals at communal roosts, accounting for 62.8% of adults. The second most dominant individuals are non-reproductive females at 22.1%, followed by males at 15.1%. The individuals of this species will almost always roost with the same group, with only ~1.6% of individuals varying this. This 1.6% is entirely non-reproductive females or adult males, suggesting reproductive females will remain dominant in a communal roost for a significant period of time. Although there is uncertainty in which population individual bats may belong in, the idea that they only roost with the same group every time suggests that the long-tailed bat may be at risk of genetic diversity reduction due to a closed social system.

== Threats and conservation ==
DOC Emblem

The long-tailed bat garnered legal protection under the New Zealand Wildlife Act 1953. With the New Zealand Department of Conservation (DOC) considering it to be under the umbrella category of 'Threatened', but the conservation status of 'Nationally Critical.' DOC also claims there are between 20,000 and 100,000 individuals left in New Zealand. The major threats for this species are mammalian predators, human and bird interference of roosts, logging of lowland forests and urbanisation. In the past 150 years, this species has become greatly affected by predation from introduced mammals. As they are one of only two native mammals in New Zealand, they did not evolve to live in conjunction with other mammals. This has resulted in an abundance of bottleneck events. The main predators for this species are stoats (Mustela erminea) and rats (Rattus rattus), as well as feral cats (Felis catus) for the populations that are nearer to urban settlements. During periods where stoat and rat presence is increased, major population declines occur for this species, and recovery is only partially effective until the next predation outbreak causes an even larger reduction. With these outbreaks occurring every 3–4 years, it is predicted that this species will be reduced by a further 90% within the next 30 years.

Current conservation efforts are being carried out by DOC, with frequent surveying and banding to understand more about the population dynamics of this species. Predator control has become a priority in the areas where this bat is commonly found. Eglinton Valley in Fiordland has been the focus of this initiative, where the population has shown significant increase as a result of conservation efforts. Monitoring is currently the most important factor in understanding how this species can be brought back from the brink of extinction. Bat recorders that can record echolocation signals are used to understand more about their distribution and how it changes seasonally.
