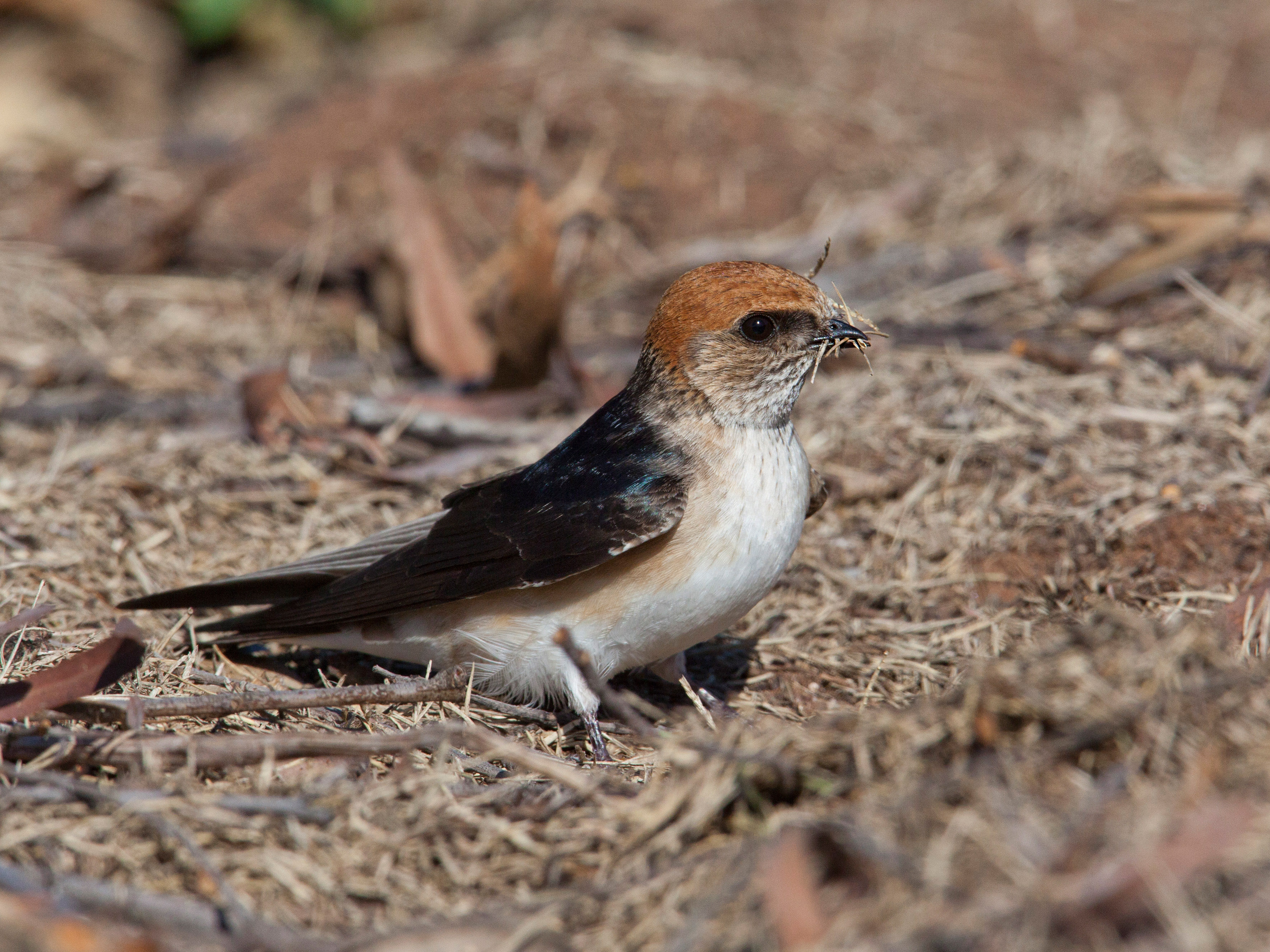

Conservation status
- Least Concern (IUCN 3.1)

Scientific classification
- Kingdom: Animalia
- Phylum: Chordata
- Class: Aves
- Order: Passeriformes
- Family: Hirundinidae
- Genus: Petrochelidon
- Species: P. ariel

Binomial name
- Petrochelidon ariel (Gould, 1842)

Synonyms
- Hirundo ariel (Gould, 1843); Petrochelidon ariel ariel (Christidis and Boles, 2008)

= Fairy martin =

Species of bird

The fairy martin (Petrochelidon ariel) is a member of the swallow family of passerine birds which breeds in Australia. It is migratory wintering through most of Australia, with some birds reaching New Guinea and Indonesia. It is increasingly a wanderer to New Zealand, where it may have bred. This species is frequently placed in the genus Hirundo as Hirundo ariel.

This is a bird of open country near water, and is usually seen near its nest sites in cliffs, culverts or bridges.

== Description ==
The fairy martin is dumpy and square tailed. It averages 12 centimetres (4.7 in) long and weighs 11 grams (0.39 oz). The adult has an iridescent blue back, brown wings and tail, a rufous crown and nape, and a whitish rump. The underparts are dull white. The sexes are similar, but young birds are duller and browner, with a paler forehead and pale fringes to the back and wing feathers.

This species can be distinguished from other Australian swallows by its pale rump. The most similar species, the tree martin, has a shallowly forked tail and blue-black head and nape.

The call of this vocal swallow is a chrrrr and the song is a high-pitched twitter. The vocalizations are higher pitched than those of the tree martin.

== Behaviour ==
Dayboro, SE Queensland, Australia

Fairy martins breed from August through to January in colonies usually of a few tens of nests, but the largest known site had 700 nests. Nests are constructed in natural holes in dead trees, riverbanks, cliff faces or rock crevices, but increasingly in artificial sites on bridges, in culverts and pipes, and on buildings.

The nest is a retort- or bottle-shaped structure, made from up to a thousand mud pellets and lined with dried grasses and feathers. The bowl is about 15 centimetres (5.9 in) in diameter, and the entrance tunnel is 5–30 centimetres (2.0–11.8 in) long. The nests in a colony are clustered together. Both sexes build the nest and share incubation and care of the young.

The clutch is usually four, sometimes five, reddish-brown speckled white eggs, and this species is often double or triple brooded.

The fairy martin feeds high in the air on flying insects, usually in large flocks. Fairy martins have a slow fluttering flight and feed higher than welcome swallows. They will also feed on insect swarms low over water, and have been recorded feeding on injured moths on a newly cut lawn. This species is highly gregarious and forms large flocks, often with tree martins.

== Ecology ==
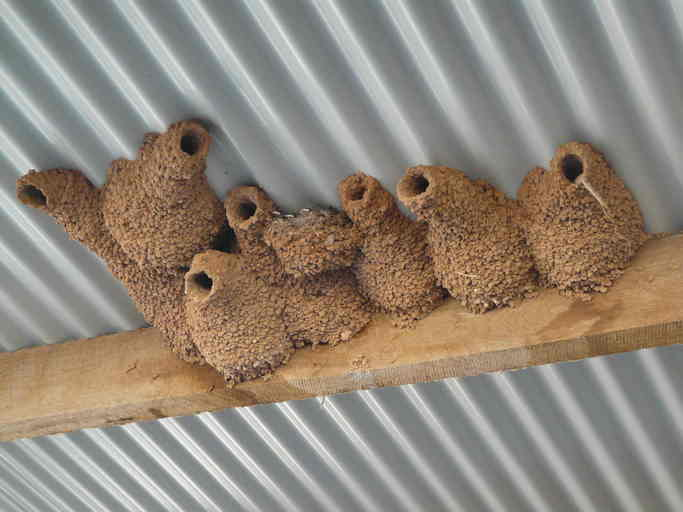
Nests

When the mud nest is vacated after breeding, it may become occupied by several species of microbats. These opportunists include the wattle bats of genus Chalinolobus (Chalinolobus morio, C. dwyeri and C. gouldii), and the small long-eared bat Nyctophilus geoffroyi.
