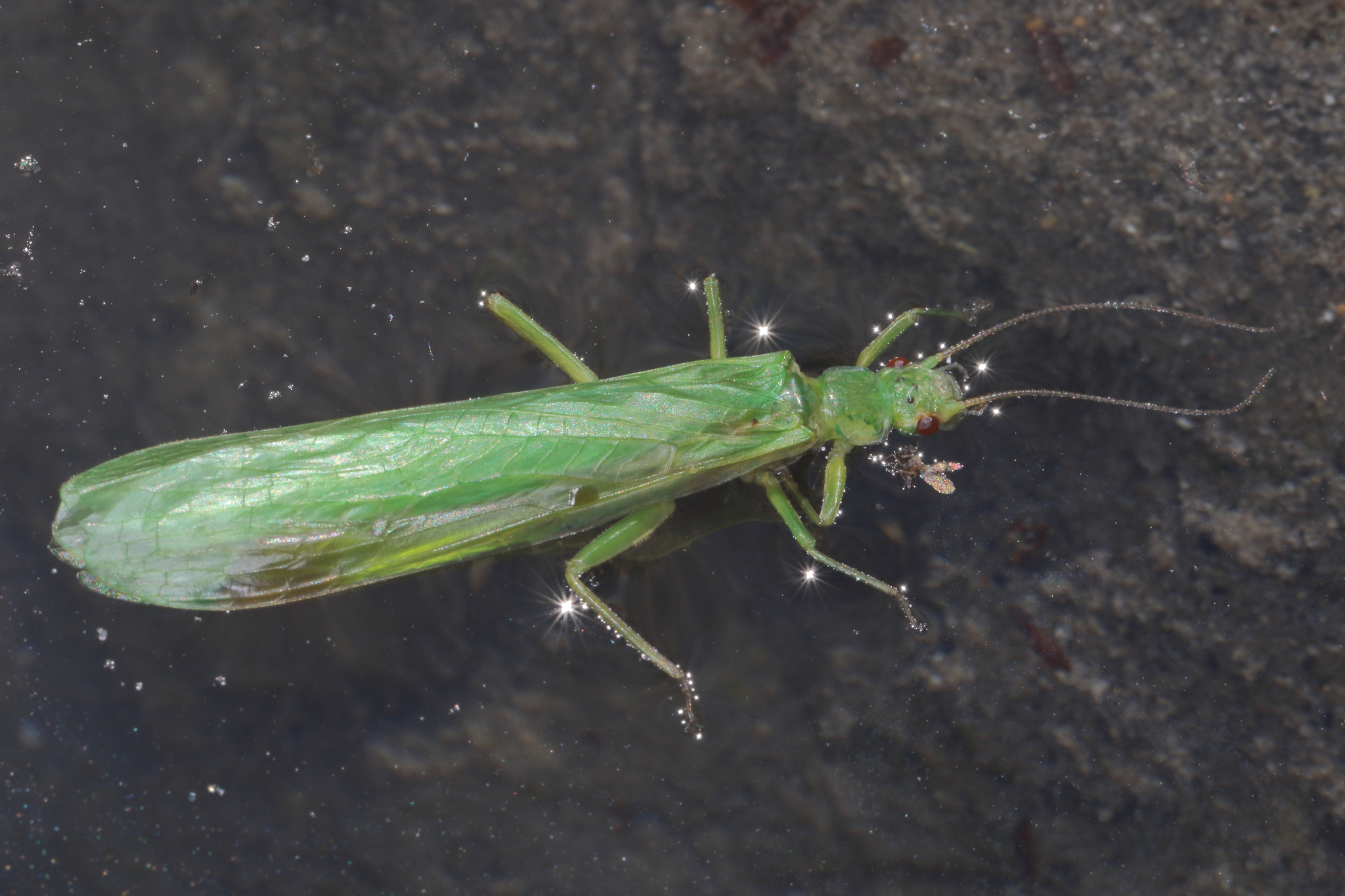
- Stenoperla prasina

Conservation status
- Not Threatened (NZ TCS)

Scientific classification
- Kingdom: Animalia
- Phylum: Arthropoda
- Clade: Pancrustacea
- Class: Insecta
- Order: Plecoptera
- Family: Eustheniidae
- Genus: Stenoperla
- Species: S. prasina

Binomial name
- Stenoperla prasina (Newman, 1845)

Synonyms
- Chloroperla prasina Newman, 1845; Hermes prasina (Newman, 1845)

= Stenoperla prasina =

Species of stonefly endemic to New Zealand

Stenoperla prasina (Māori: ngarongaro wai) is a species of stonefly belonging to the family Eustheniidae. This species is endemic to New Zealand and is classified as "Not Threatened" under the New Zealand Threat Classification System. It is found on the North, South and Stewart Island / Rakiura Islands as well as on Little Barrier Island. Although adults of this species are most often coloured bright green, this species can be coloured yellow. This species inhabits clean, cold, running streams and rivers with stony bottoms within native bush. It is a known indicator of water quality. The larvae eat plant detritus and other aquatic insects while the adult insects feed on sooty mould fungi as well as other plant matter. The adults of this species are a known food source for New Zealand long tailed bats. Adults have been dissected and have been found to have been carrying Nematomorpha and trematode parasites. The New Zealand Department of Conservation classifies this species as "Not Threatened". In 2022 a specimen of this species was the 5 millionth specimen to be digitised in the Natural History Museum, London collection.

== Taxonomy ==
This species was described by Edward Newman in 1845 using a specimen obtained by Mr Saunders and named Chloroperla prasina. Newman noted however that the "species agrees but indifferently with the genus Chloroperla". In 1852 Francis Walker placed this species within the genus Hermes. In 1867 Robert McLaughlan created the genus Stenoperia and placed this species within it. George Hudson discussed and illustrated this species both in his 1892 publication An elementary manual of New Zealand entomology as well as in his 1904 publication New Zealand Neuroptera. The holotype specimen of this species is held at the Natural History Museum, London.

== Description ==
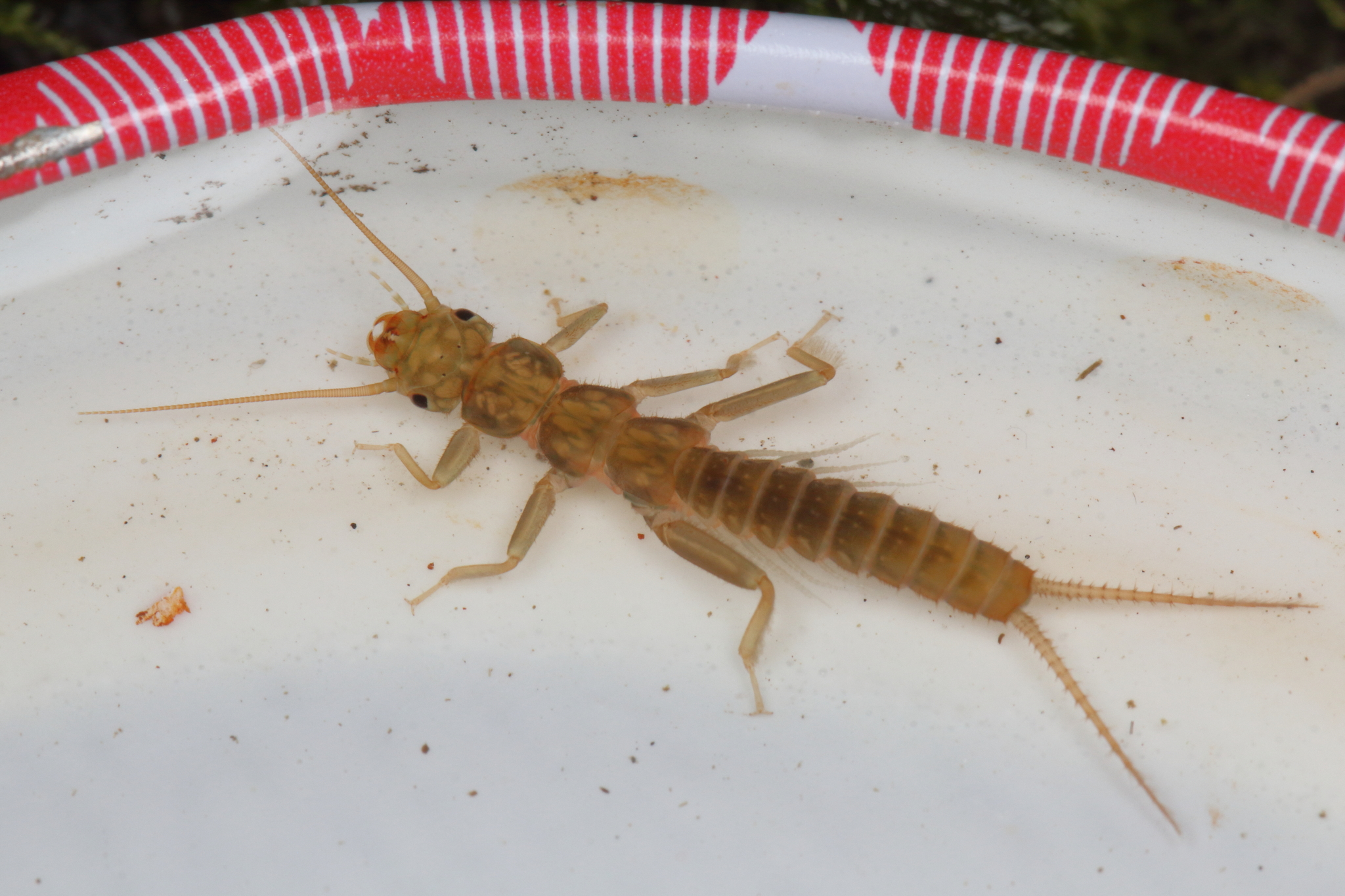
Stenoperla prasina nymph

Newman described this species as follows:

Both the antennae are broken, so that their original length and number of joints cannot be ascertained; the remaining joints are nearly equal in length and breadth; their sutures are very evident; their colour is faded green. The head is flat, and of a green colour, the eyes being prominent and black; the ocelli three, and colourless. The prothorax is flat, rather narrower than the head; its transverse diameter slightly the greatest, its anterior margin nearly straight, posterior rounded, colour green. The fore-wings are glossy, and of a delicate pea-green, the nervures somewhat darker, the hind-wings are more hyaline, but delicately tinted with green, the costal half is glossy. The entire body, legs, and caudal setae appear to have been green, although now faded; the setae scarcely exceed a fourth of the body in length; they are composed of thirteen joints. Expansion of the wings, 2 inches.

The distinguishing feature of this insect in its nymph stage is the presence of a hair fringe on the dorsal side of the distal segments of the cerci. As this feature is not always present in early instars this can cause issues when attempting to identify this species in its nymph stage. Although by far the majority of specimens are coloured green it is possible for the adults of this species to be coloured yellow.

== Distribution ==
This species is endemic to New Zealand. It is found throughout the three main islands of New Zealand as well as on Little Barrier Island.

== Habitat ==
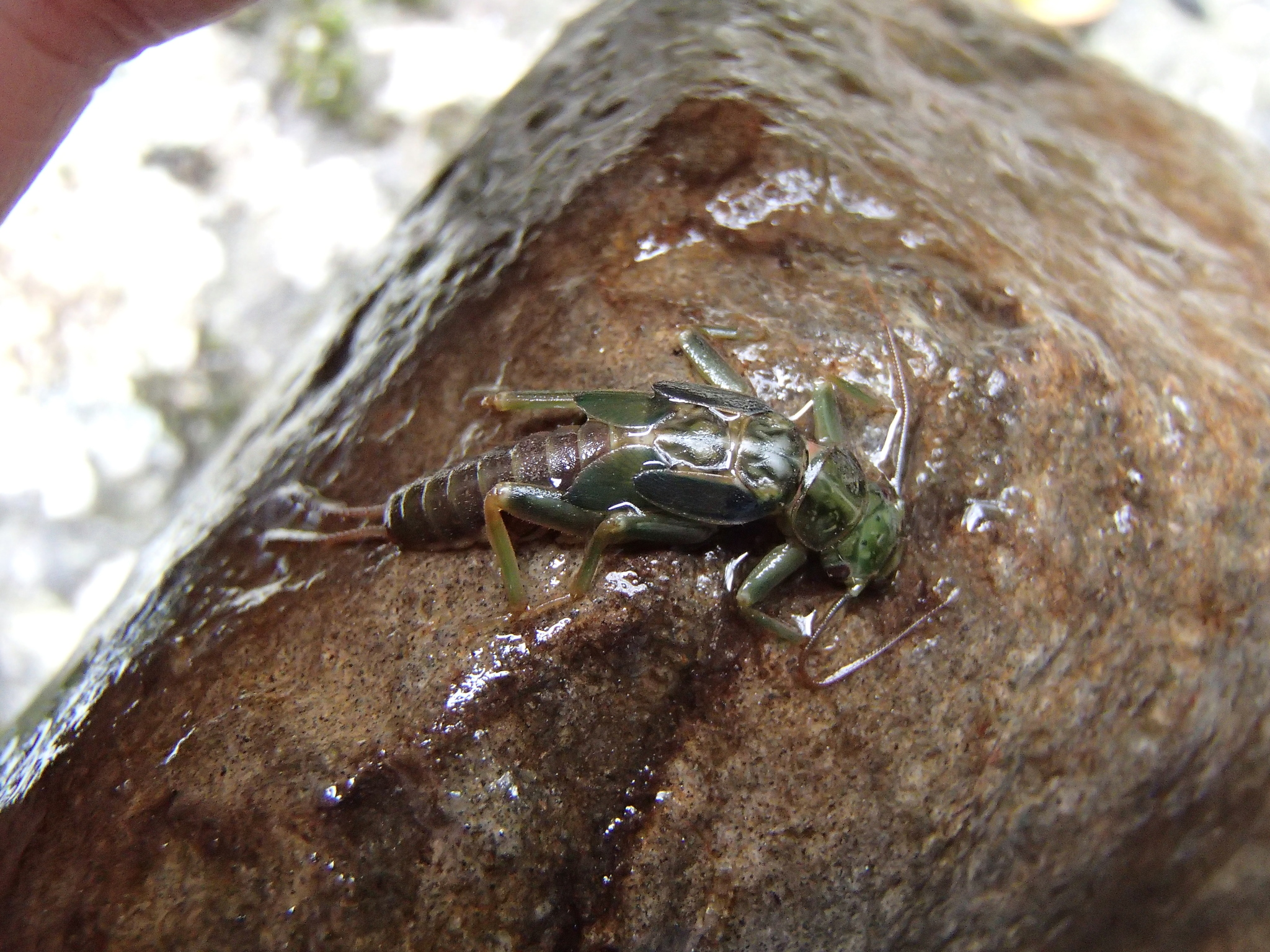
S. prasina nymph

The larvae of this species is commonly found in cold running streams with stony bottoms in native bush.

== Behaviour and life history ==
The female lays up to 75 dark brown eggs each of which is covered by a thick film that dissolves in under a day. The eggs are disbursed at the water surface and then sink to attach to submerged rocks and or detritus. Larvae are found in running streams and rivers throughout the year. The larvae are fast moving and can hide itself from predators amongst stones on the bottoms of the streams in which it lives. When ready to change into an adult insect the larva climbs out of its stream and clings to a plant or rock. Once its exoskeleton has dried its back cracks open and the adult emerges, ready to expand and dry its wings. The adult is on the wing from October to March. Adults of this species can be observed flying at dusk and are attracted to light.

== Hosts ==
The larger larvae of this species are known to predate other invertebrates, particular species within the order Ephemeroptera, that inhabit streams and river beds. Larvae appear to show a preference for species within the Zephlebia genus as well as Ameletopsis perscitus.

Adults of this species feed on sooty mould fungi as well as pollen grains, spores of tree ferns such as Cyathea medullaris and Cyathea smithii, and other plant detritus. Further research is needed to judge the importance of sooty moulds as a food source for S. prasina and also whether it plays a role as a vector assisting honeydew to be eaten by S. prasina.

== Predators and parasites ==
Adults of this species are known to be a food source for the New Zealand long-tailed bat. Adult S. prasina have also been found to be infected with Nematomorpha and trematode parasites.

== Conservation status and water quality indicator ==
S. prasina is classified as "Not Threatened" under the New Zealand Threat Classification System. The presence of nymphs of this species in streams and rivers indicates that the water and habitat is of good quality.

== Digitisation milestone ==
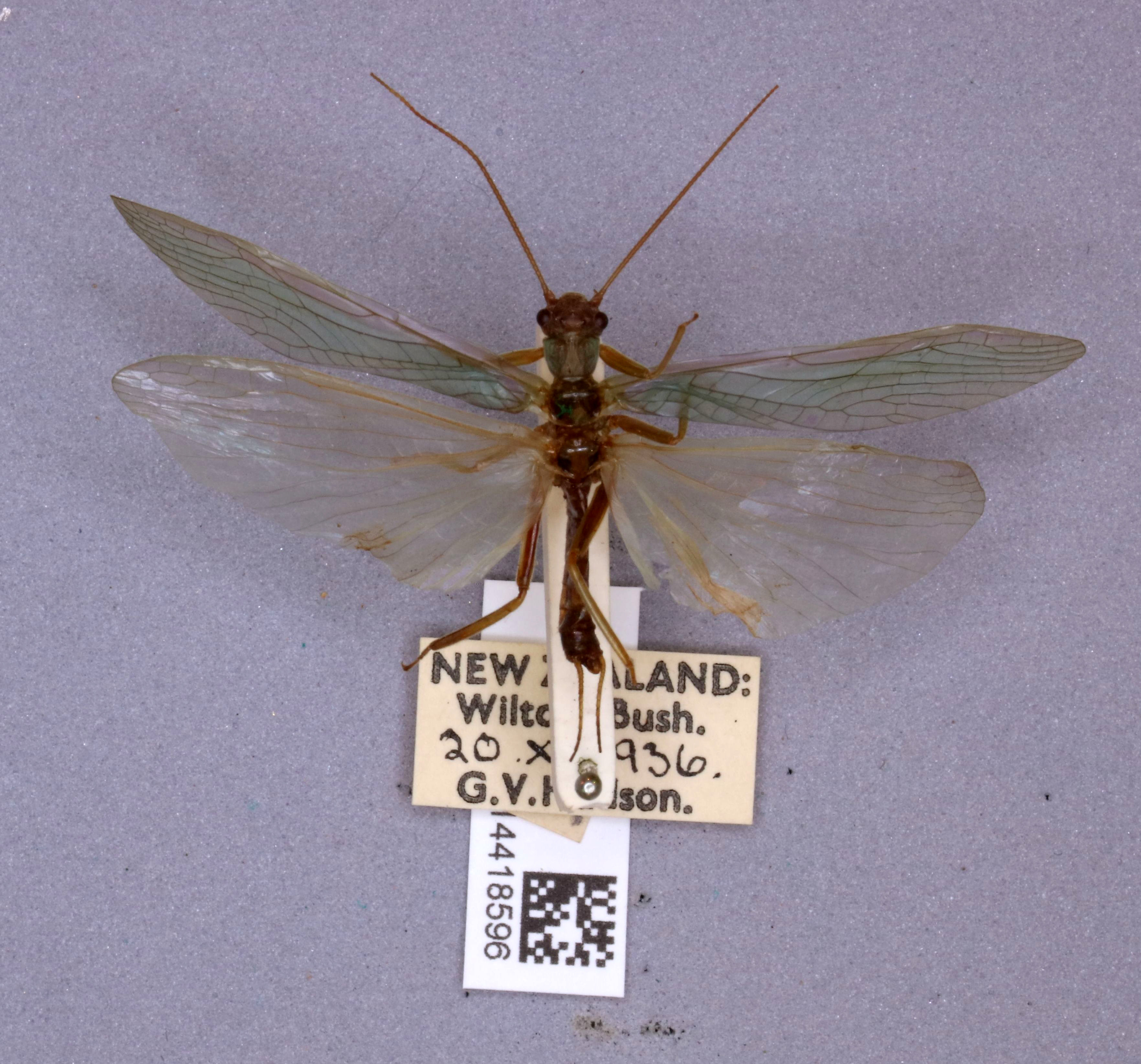
Stenoperla prasina BNHM(E)014418596, the 5 millionth specimen digitised by the Natural History Museum, London.

In 2022 a specimen of this species, collected by George Hudson at Otari-Wilton's bush in 1936, was the 5 millionth specimen to be digitised by the Natural History Museum, London.
