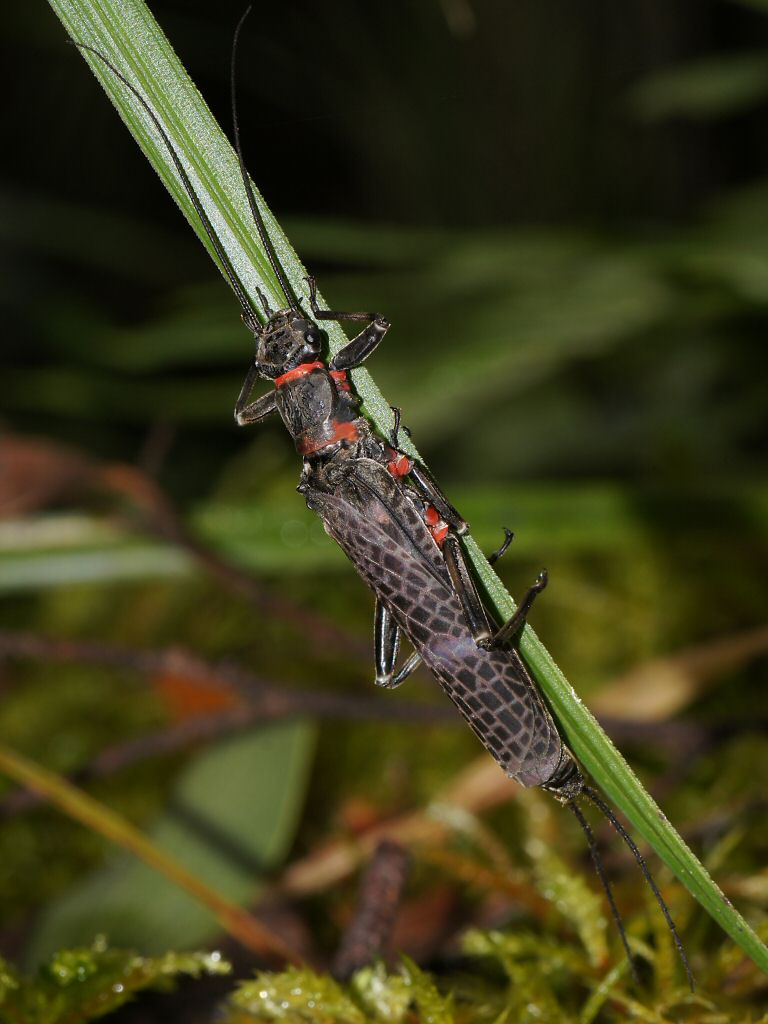

Conservation status
- Vulnerable (IUCN 3.1)

Scientific classification
- Kingdom: Animalia
- Phylum: Arthropoda
- Clade: Pancrustacea
- Class: Insecta
- Order: Plecoptera
- Family: Eustheniidae
- Genus: Eusthenia
- Species: E. nothofagi

Binomial name
- Eusthenia nothofagi Zwick, 1979

= Eusthenia nothofagi =

Species of stonefly

Eusthenia nothofagi is a species of stonefly in the family Eustheniidae. It is endemic to Australia, where its range is restricted to Victoria. It is known only from the Otway Ranges and its common name is the Otway stonefly.

This insect lives in streams in temperate rainforest dominated by myrtle beech (Nothofagus cunninghamii) and wet sclerophyll dominated by mountain ash (Eucalyptus regnans).

This species was described in 1979. It is similar to Eusthenia venosa, but its wings are more red than solid purple.

This species is considered to be "vulnerable". Threats include climate change and clearing of the local forest habitat. As of 1991 the insect was thought to be extinct, but subsequent surveys recorded its distribution.
