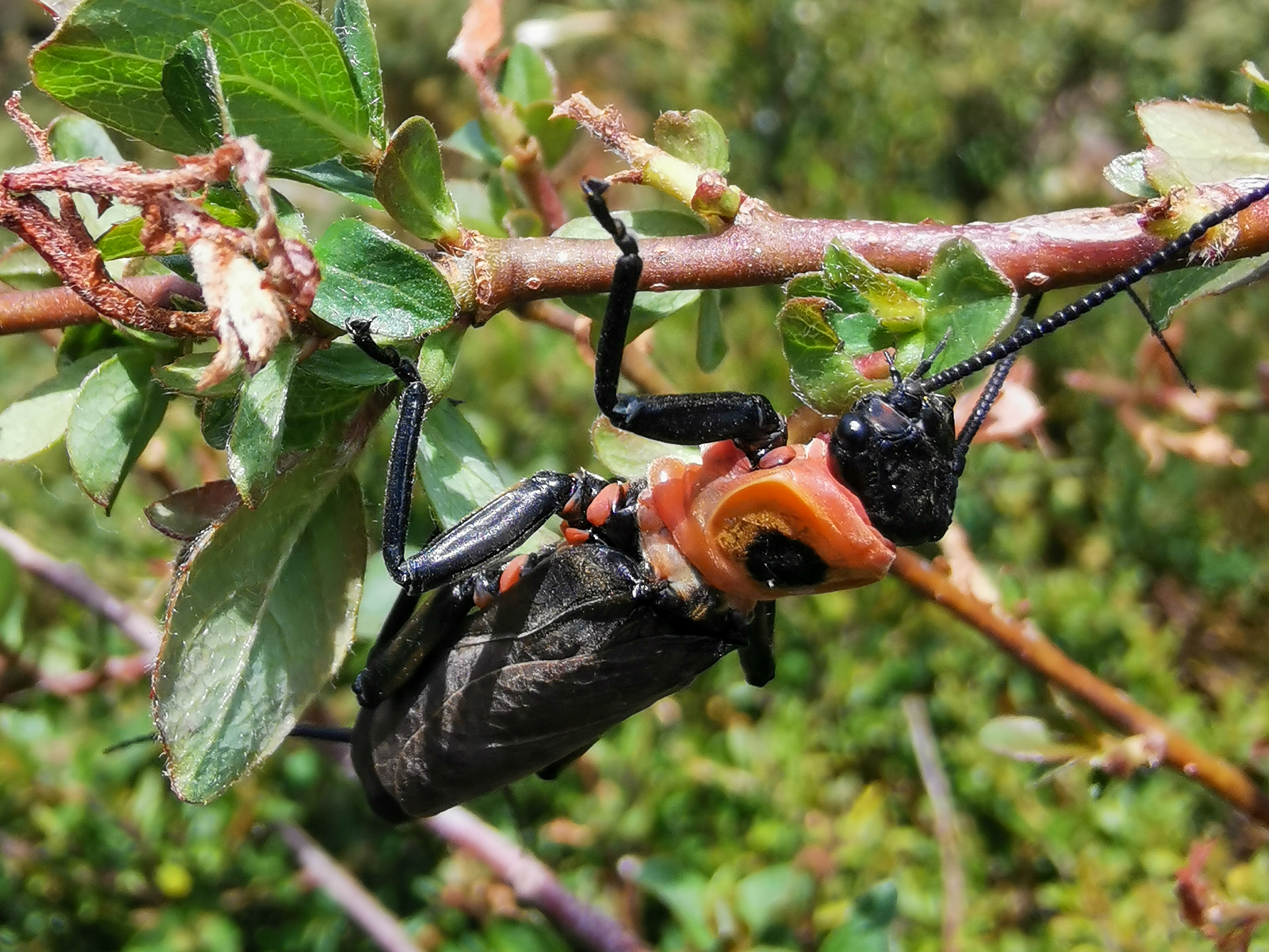
- Habitus photograph of Thaumatoperla alpina, Falls Creek, Victoria.

Conservation status
- Endangered (EPBC Act)

Scientific classification
- Kingdom: Animalia
- Phylum: Arthropoda
- Class: Insecta
- Order: Plecoptera
- Family: Eustheniidae
- Genus: Thaumatoperla
- Species: T. alpina

Binomial name
- Thaumatoperla alpina Burns & Neboiss, 1957

= Thaumatoperla alpina =

Species of stonefly

Thaumatoperla alpina is a species of stonefly in the genus Thaumatoperla, and are the largest Australian stonefly. They are endemic to the Bogong High Plains area of the Victorian alps, Australia.

== Description ==
Large insect, females 36–44 mm (excluding antennae and cerci), males generally smaller.

As adult: Two pairs of wide, black membranous wings, the posterior wings having a dark-blue iridescence. Head and legs black. The prothorax is large, oval-shaped and orange and with a distinct black marking in the centre of the pronotum. The cylindrical abdomen is slightly flattened dorsally and pale yellowish-grey with black markings. Two large black cerci and two long black antennae.

They are incapable of flight.

== Distribution ==
Thaumatoperla alpina are endemic to the Bogong High Plains of the Victorian alpine area in south-eastern Australia. Genetic analyses indicate that there are three sub-populations separated by the three main catchments: West Kiewa, East Kiewa and Mitta Mitta.

== Habitat ==
T. alpina inhabit alpine riparian heathland. Nymphs live in the hyporheic zone of mountain streams. Where introduced rainbow trout (Oncorhynchus mykiss) are absent, T. alpina nymphs are the top-level stream predators.

== Life history ==
T. alpina spend approximately three years as nymphs. They emerge as adults in January - April.

== Etymology ==
From Latin Alpinus, referring to their alpine habitat.

== Conservation status ==
Listed as Threatened under the EPBC Act 1999 and Flora and Fauna Guarantee Act 1988. Classified as Endangered by the International Union for Conservation of Nature (IUCN).
