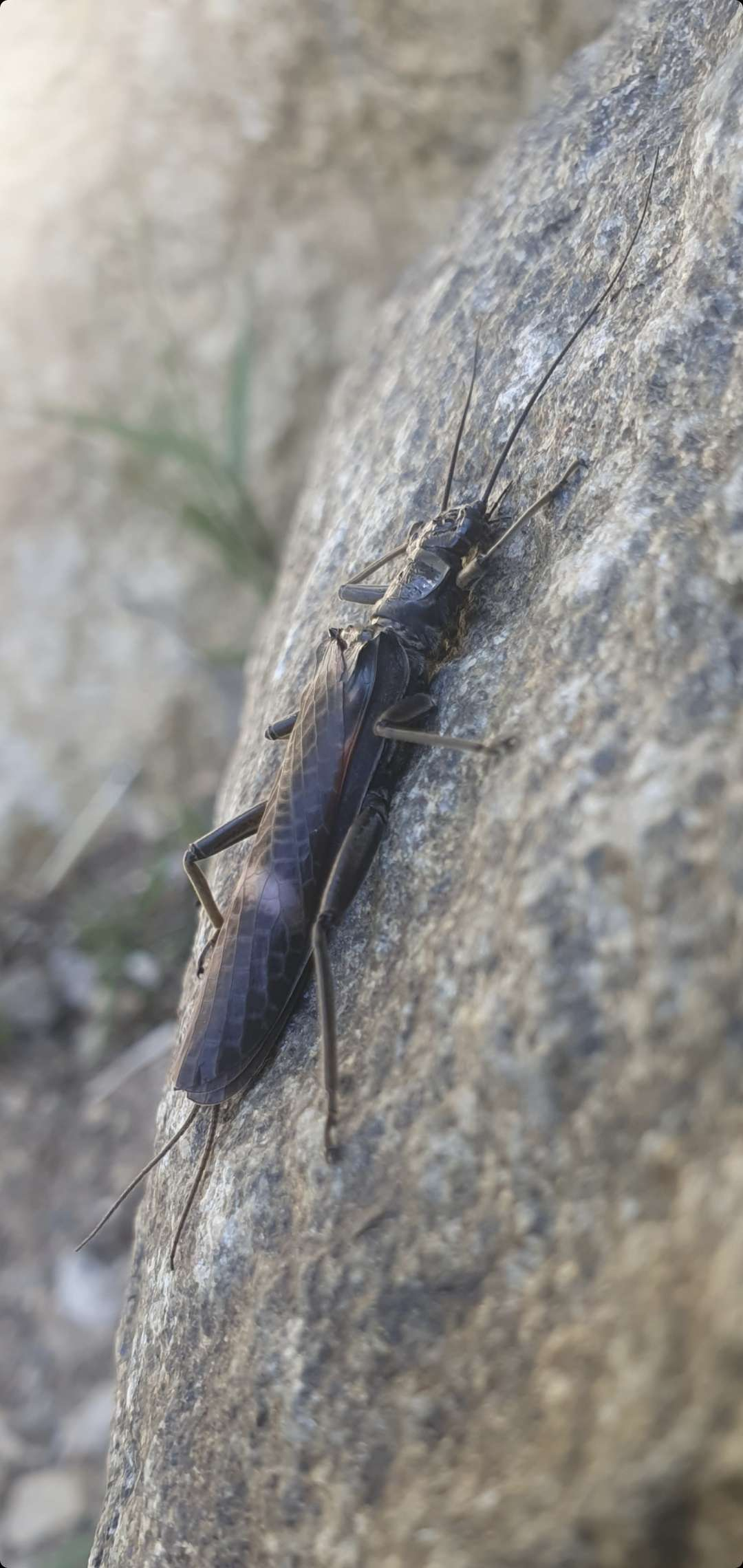
- Adult

Scientific classification
- Kingdom: Animalia
- Phylum: Arthropoda
- Clade: Pancrustacea
- Class: Insecta
- Order: Plecoptera
- Family: Eustheniidae
- Genus: Eusthenia
- Species: E. spectabilis

Binomial name
- Eusthenia spectabilis Westwood, 1832
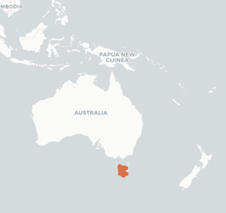
- distribution for Eusthenia spectabilis, restricted to Tasmania

= Eusthenia spectabilis =

Species of stonefly

Eusthenia spectabilis is a very large species of stonefly in the family of giant stoneflies, Eustheniidae. At 4 cm (1.6 in) Eusthenia spectabilis is the largest member of the genus and emerges later than other similar species.

== Appearance ==
Extremely similar to other members of the genus Eusthenia, mature adults have an elongate, flattened and soft body with long, filamentous cerci however, those of E. spectabili are shorter and thicker in relation to body size than other species. The head, thorax, legs and abdomen is mostly dark grey to black however can have orange to red fringes, the occipital ridge is often red in pristine individuals. The wings of this species are also dark with a purple base, pale veins and horizontal band two-thirds of the way down, the hindwing is mostly red with the distal end being dark.

Sexual dimorphism is found in all life stages with females being larger in both adult and nymph forms the species is perhaps best identified from it external genitalia, males having short and untoothed epicrot whilst females having a simple genital plate which are distinctive compared to other members of Eusthenia.

== Life history and behaviour ==
As with most stonefly E. spectabilis is a completely aquatic carnivore at juvenile stages, developing into a less voracious winged, ephemeral adult.

Laying and egg shape of many stoneflies including E. spectabilis was largely researched by Hugh Bernard Noel Hynes, where eggs enter the stream by deposition via the females ovipositor.

Nymphs, often referred to as a naiad can vary in colour with younger individuals starting off green and darkening to brown or black, despite this individuals may retain the colour of lower instar. Naiads will emerge roughly after year then, climbing into the riparian zone to moult into adults.

== Distribution ==
It is endemic to Tasmania, where its range is mainly found in alpine and subalpine streams and rivers of Western Tasmania.

== Research ==
E. spectabilis has had little attention from science as many Australian invertebrates, many stoneflies have been used to indicate water quality however. Studies on E. spectabilis have shown to survive when water is polluted with heavy metals. E. spectabilis was the first freshwater invertebrate recorded to produce metallothionein this was in response to high cadmium concentrations
