= Coastal lobe-lipped bat =

Scientific classification
- Kingdom: Animalia
- Phylum: Chordata
- Class: Mammalia
- Order: Chiroptera
- Family: Vespertilionidae
- Genus: Chalinolobus
- Species: C. orarius

Binomial name
- Chalinolobus orarius Parnaby, A. G. King, S. Hamilton, & Eldridge, 2024

Species of bat

The Coastal lobe-lipped Bat or Coastal wattled bat (Chalinolobus orarius) is a species of vesper bat native to New Guinea and coastal northern Australia.
