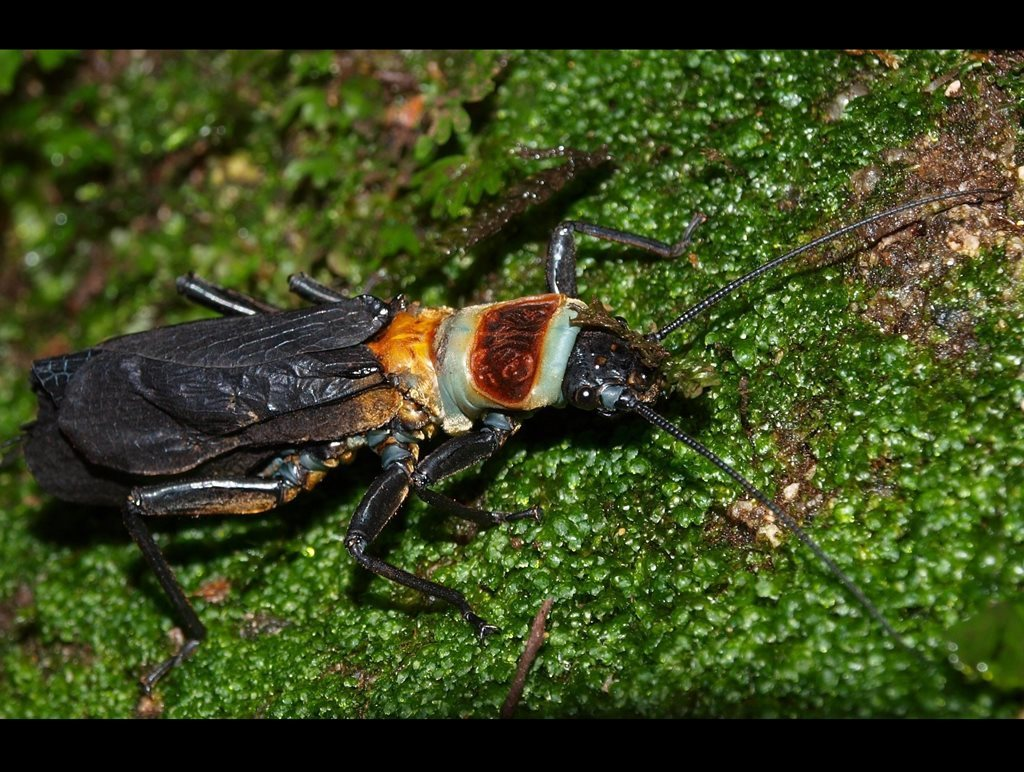
- Thaumatoperla robusta

Scientific classification
- Kingdom: Animalia
- Phylum: Arthropoda
- Clade: Pancrustacea
- Class: Insecta
- Order: Plecoptera
- Family: Eustheniidae
- Genus: Thaumatoperla; Tillyard, 1921

= Thaumatoperla =

Genus of stoneflies

Thaumatoperla is a genus of insect in the family Eustheniidae containing four species of stonefly, all endemic to the Victorian alpine area of Australia.

== Description ==
Thaumatoperla are large stoneflies with large pronota and wide wings, though incapable of flight.

== Taxonomy ==
Thaumatoperla contains the following species:

- Thaumatoperla alpina Burns & Neboiss, 1957
- Thaumatoperla flaveola Burns & Neboiss, 1957
- Thaumatoperla robusta Tillyard, 1921
- Thaumatoperla timmsi Zwick, 1979

Type species: Thaumatoperla robusta Tillyard, 1921 by original designation.
