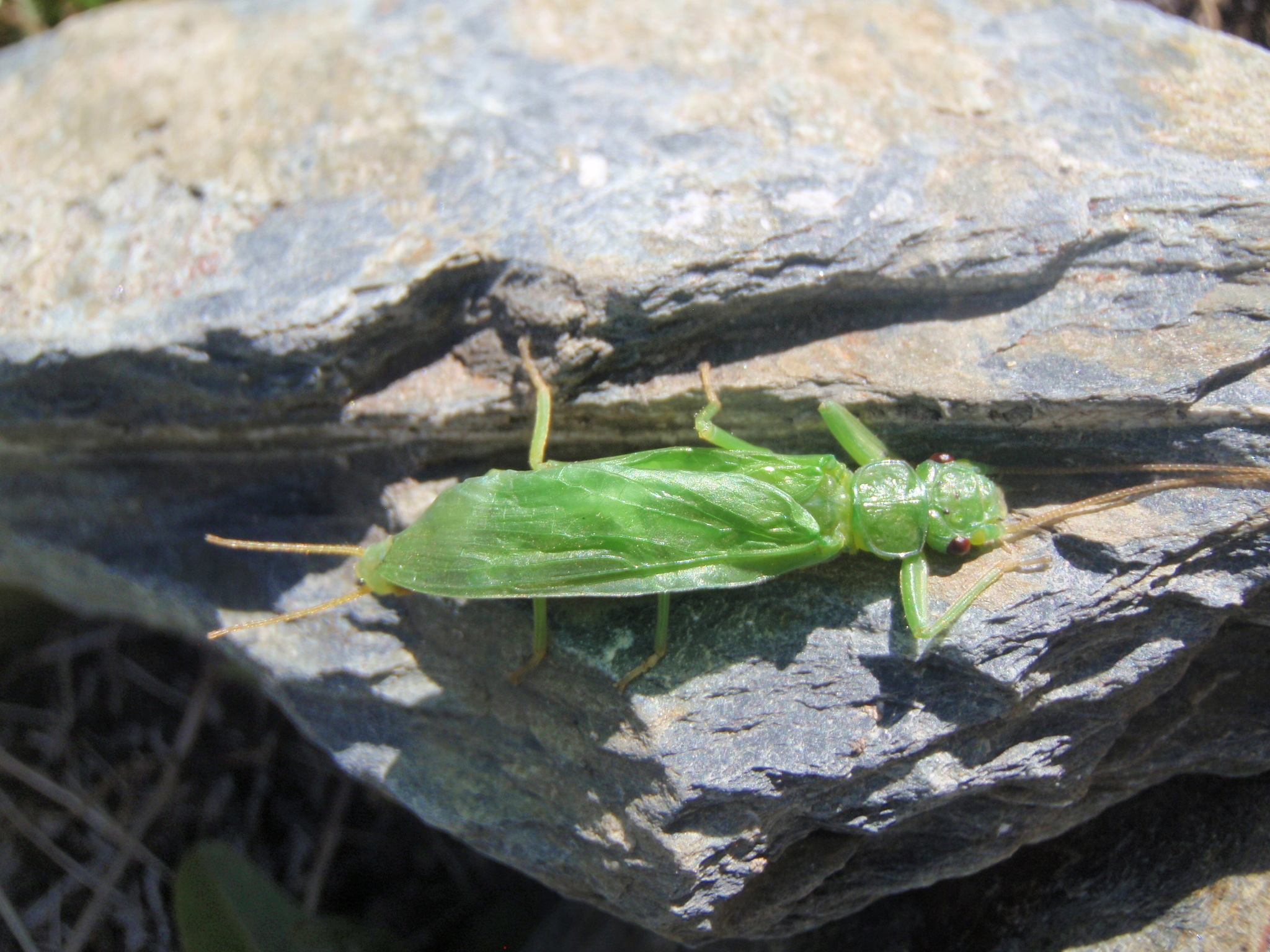
- Stenoperla prasina

Scientific classification
- Domain: Eukaryota
- Kingdom: Animalia
- Phylum: Arthropoda
- Class: Insecta
- Order: Plecoptera
- Family: Eustheniidae
- Subfamily: Stenoperlinae
- Genus: Stenoperla; McLachlan, 1867

= Stenoperla =

Genus of stoneflies

Stenoperla is a genus of insect in the family Eustheniidae containing a number of species of stonefly all endemic to New Zealand.

It contains the following species:

- Stenoperla helsoni (McLellan, 1996)
- Stenoperla hendersoni (McLellan, 1996)
- Stenoperla maclellani (Zwick, 1979)
- Stenoperla prasina (Newman, 1845)
