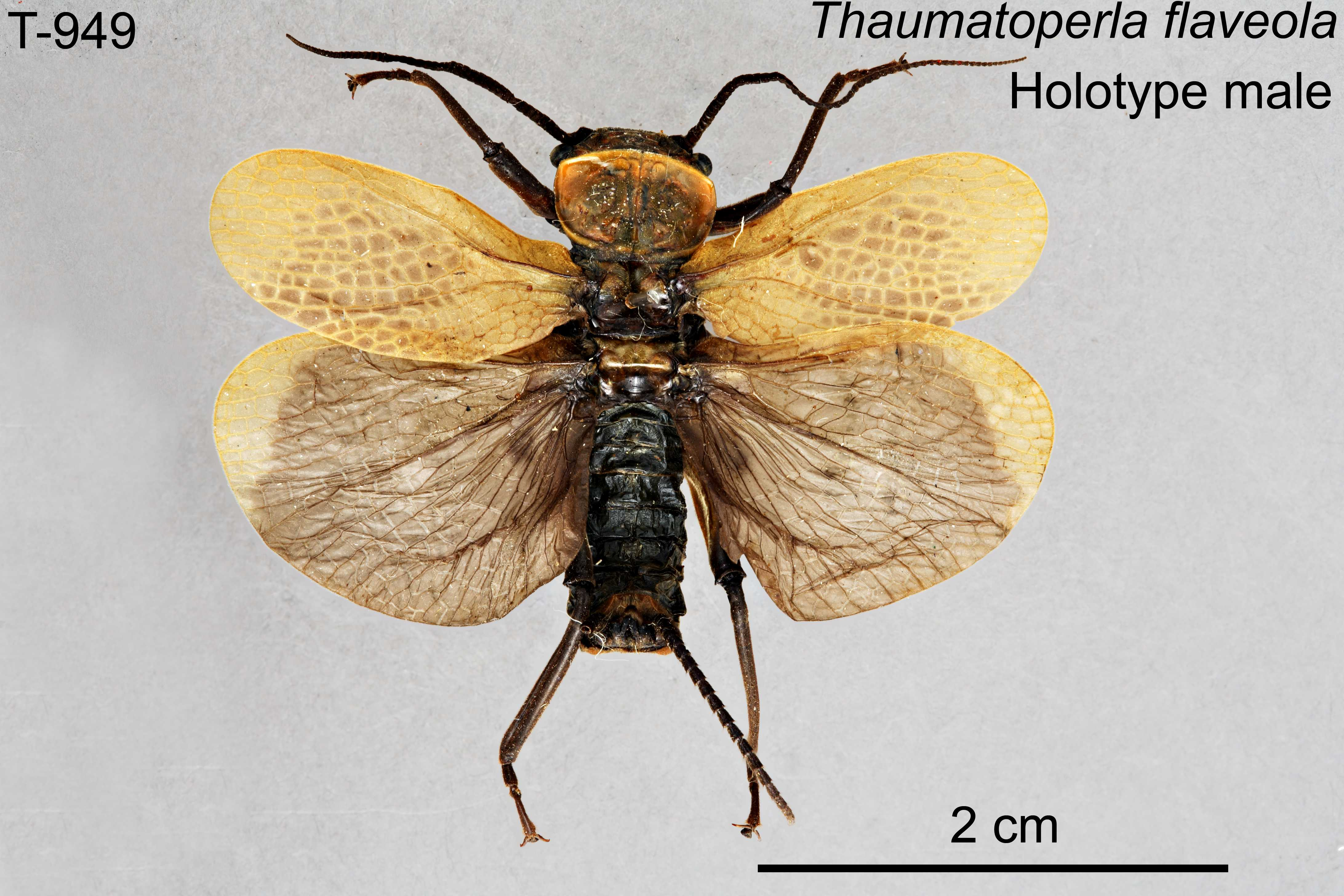
- Thaumatoperla flaveola holotype, Museum Victoria

Scientific classification
- Kingdom: Animalia
- Phylum: Arthropoda
- Class: Insecta
- Order: Plecoptera
- Family: Eustheniidae
- Genus: Thaumatoperla
- Species: T. flaveola

Binomial name
- Thaumatoperla flaveola Burns & Neboiss, 1957

= Thaumatoperla flaveola =

Species of stonefly

Thaumatoperla flaveola is a species of stonefly in the genus Thaumatoperla. They are endemic to the Mount Buller–Mount Stirling area of the Victoria alps, Australia.

== Description ==
Medium-large insect.

As adult: Two pairs of wide, membranous wings. Anterior wings tawny-olive and mottled. Posterior wings deep grey. Head reddish-brown, with darker area in front. Legs dark-brown. The prothorax is yellow-brown, the mesothorax dark-brown, and the metathorax black. The cylindrical abdomen is slightly flattened dorsally and shiny black. Two large black cerci and two long black antennae.

They are incapable of flight.

== Distribution ==
Thaumatoperla flaveola are endemic to the Mount Buller–Mount Stirling area of the Victoria alpine area in south-eastern Australia. They have not been recorded below 1100m.

== Habitat ==
T. flaveola inhabit alpine riparian heathland. Nymphs live in the hyporheic zone of mountain streams.

== Life history ==
T. flaveola emerge as adults in February - May.

== Etymology ==
From Latin flāvus, referring to their yellowish colouring.

== Conservation status ==
Listed as Threatened under the Flora and Fauna Guarantee Act 1988.
