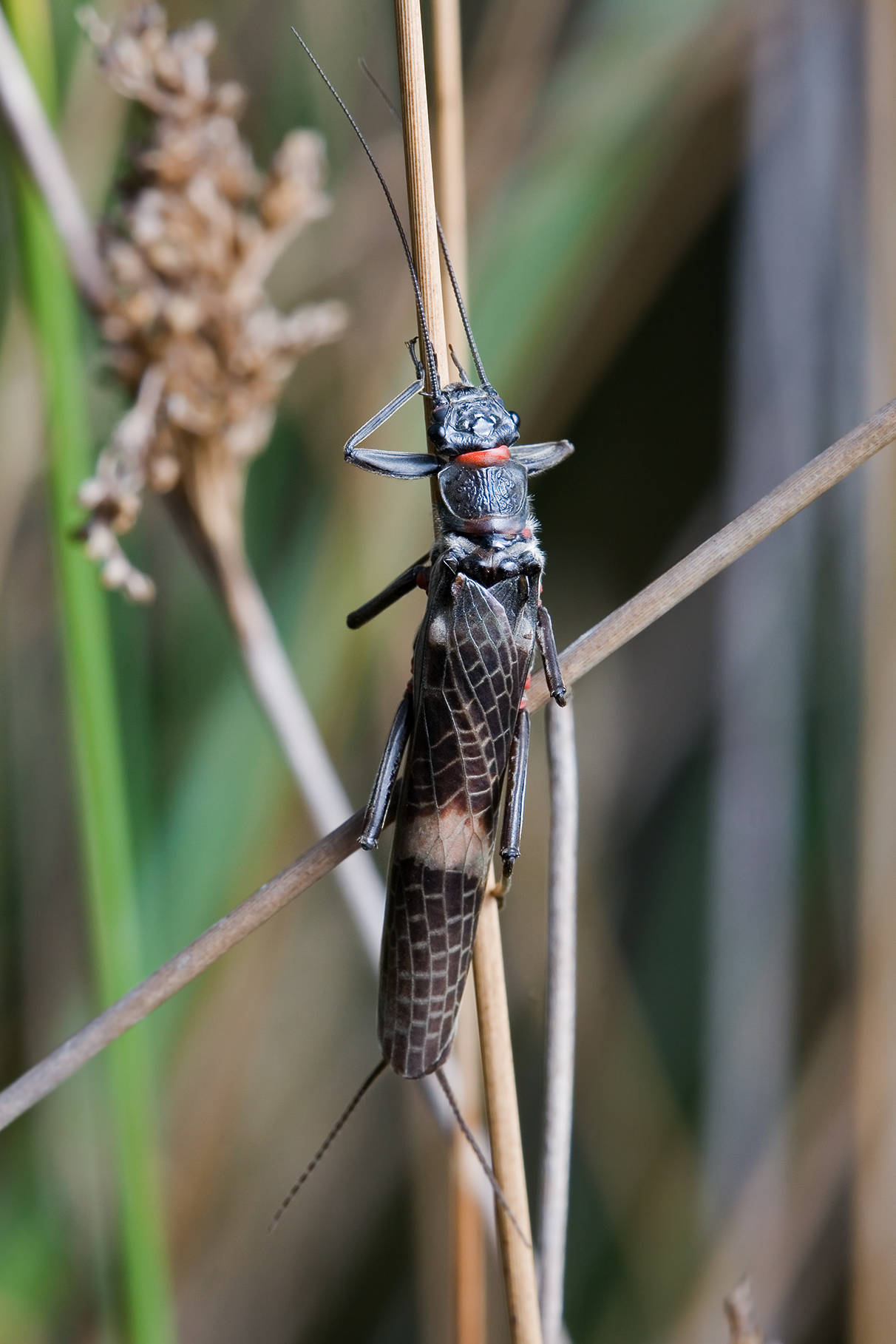
- Eusthenia sp.

Scientific classification
- Kingdom: Animalia
- Phylum: Arthropoda
- Clade: Pancrustacea
- Class: Insecta
- Order: Plecoptera
- Family: Eustheniidae
- Genus: Eusthenia; Westwood, 1832

= Eusthenia =

Genus of stoneflies

Eusthenia is a genus of stonefly in the family Eustheniidae. It is endemic to Australia, with most species native to Tasmania.

It contains the following species: E. brachyptera is considered a subspecies of E. venosa and Eusthenia extensa or Eusthenia purpurescens are considered E. costalis.

- Eusthenia costalis TAS
- Eusthenia lacustris TAS
- Eusthenia nothofagi (Otway stonefly) VIC
- Eusthenia reticulata TAS
- Eusthenia spectabilis TAS
- Eusthenia venosa ACT NSW VIC
