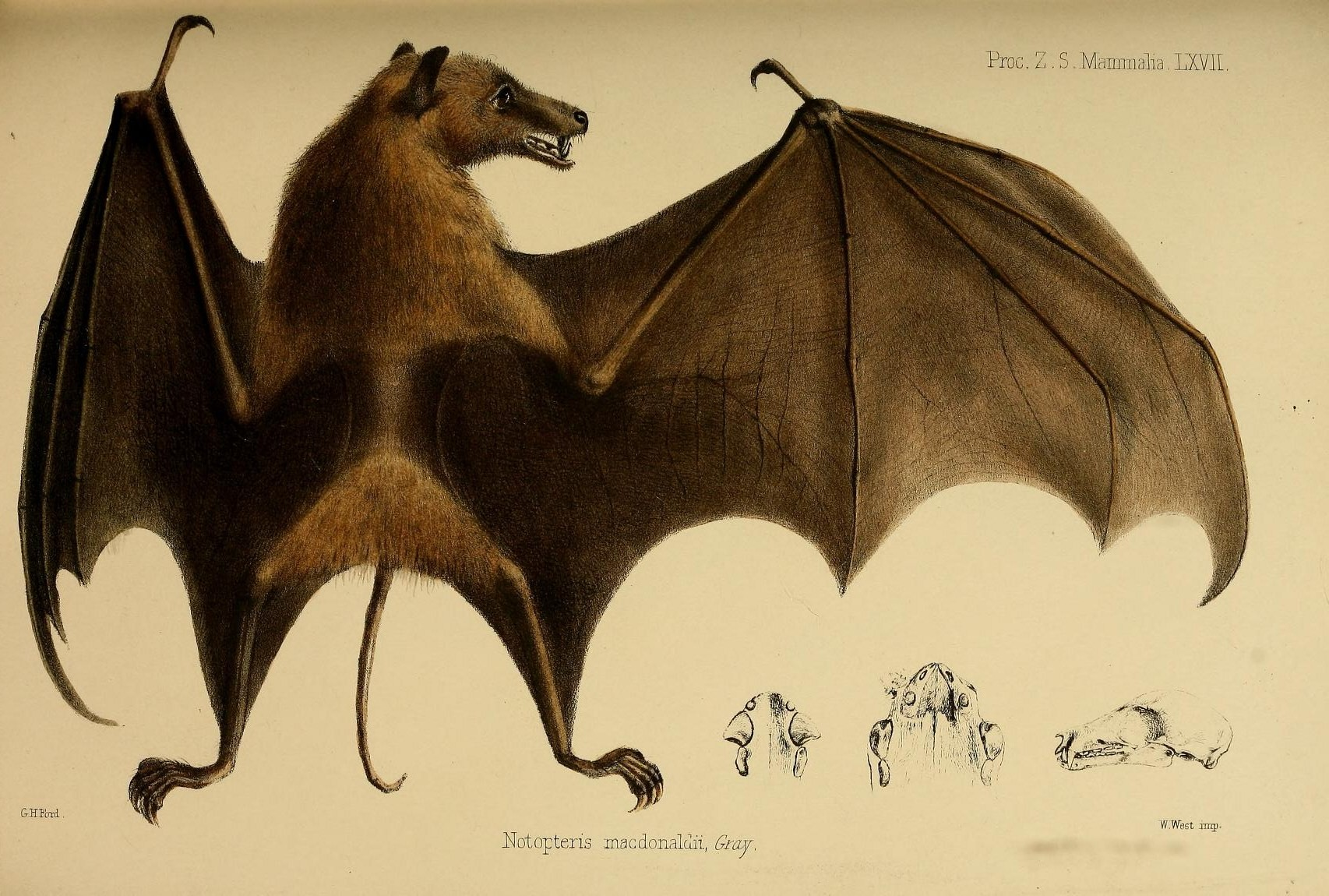

Scientific classification
- Domain: Eukaryota
- Kingdom: Animalia
- Phylum: Chordata
- Class: Mammalia
- Order: Chiroptera
- Family: Pteropodidae
- Subfamily: Macroglossinae; Almeida, Simmons & Giannni, 2020
- Genus: Notopteris; Gray, 1859

Type species
- Notopteris macdonaldi Gray, 1859

Species
- See text

= Notopteris =

Genus of bats

Notopteris (long-tailed blossom bat) is a genus of megabats in the family Pteropodidae, and the sole member of the subfamily Notopterisinae. It contains the following species:

- Long-tailed fruit bat, Notopteris macdonaldi (Fiji and Vanuatu)
- New Caledonia blossom bat, Notopteris neocaledonica (New Caledonia)
