= New Caledonia blossom bat =

Conservation status
- Endangered (IUCN 3.1)

Scientific classification
- Kingdom: Animalia
- Phylum: Chordata
- Class: Mammalia
- Order: Chiroptera
- Family: Pteropodidae
- Genus: Notopteris
- Species: N. neocaledonica

Binomial name
- Notopteris neocaledonica Trouessart, 1908
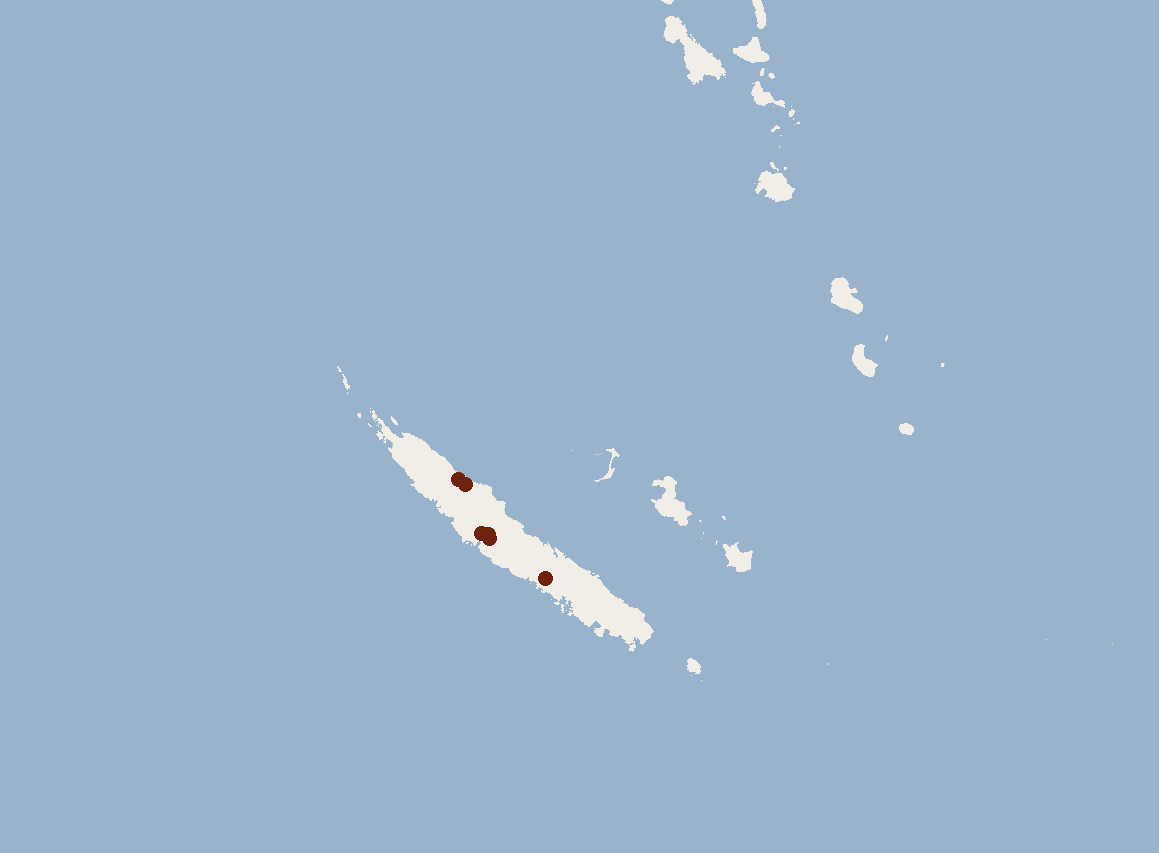
- Geographical distribution of Notopteris neocaldeonica based on museum specimens

Species of bat

The New Caledonia blossom bat (Notopteris neocaledonica) is an uncommon species of megabat in the family Pteropodidae. The species lives in caves in northern New Caledonia, and forms colonies of up to 300.

== Habitat ==
The New Caledonia blossom bat is a cave roosting species that is endemic to New Caledonia and is found in few caves located in Northern Grande Terre. It has on occasion been found in hollow trees, which can provide temporary roosts for the bats but are inadequate to provide for the needs of a large nursing colony. This species is presumed to forage in the tropical moist forest.

== Diet ==
The New Caledonia Blossom Bat is a nectar-feeding bat that forages for food in montane ecosystems rather than dry forest. It has been observed feeding on coconut flowers near human habitations.

== Conservation ==
The species is classified as endangered by the IUCN. Threats include disturbance at roosting caves and, to a small degree, hunting. Hunting is regulated under wildlife laws. Only one recorded occurrence has been documented originating from Riviére Bleu National Park.
