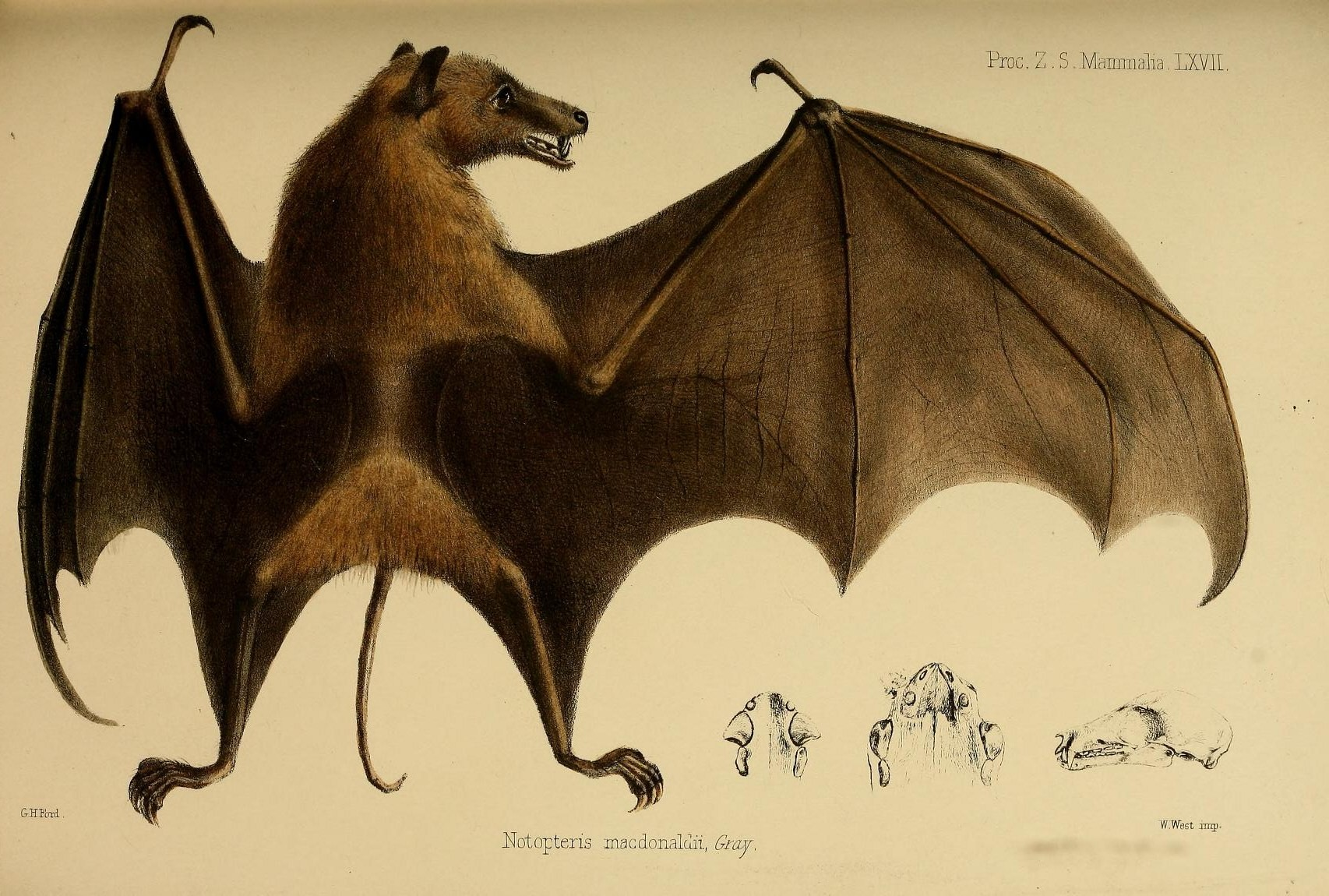

Conservation status
- Vulnerable (IUCN 3.1)

Scientific classification
- Kingdom: Animalia
- Phylum: Chordata
- Class: Mammalia
- Order: Chiroptera
- Family: Pteropodidae
- Genus: Notopteris
- Species: N. macdonaldi

Binomial name
- Notopteris macdonaldi Gray, 1859
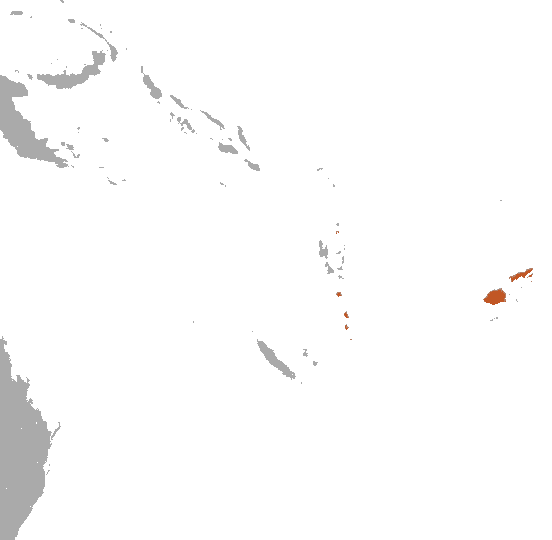
- Long-tailed fruit bat range

= Long-tailed fruit bat =

Species of bat

The long-tailed fruit bat, long-tailed blossom bat, or Fijian blossom bat (Notopteris macdonaldi) is a species of megabat in the family Pteropodidae. It is found in Fiji and Vanuatu. They roost as large colonies in caves and forage in a range of lowland and montane habitats. They are threatened by exploitation and disturbance of roosting caves, hunting, and tourism.
