= New Caledonian wattled bat =

Conservation status
- Endangered (IUCN 3.1)

Scientific classification
- Kingdom: Animalia
- Phylum: Chordata
- Class: Mammalia
- Order: Chiroptera
- Family: Vespertilionidae
- Genus: Chalinolobus
- Species: C. neocaledonicus

Binomial name
- Chalinolobus neocaledonicus Revilliod, 1914

Synonyms
- Chalinolobus gouldii neocaledonicus Revilliod, 1914

Species of bat

The New Caledonian wattled bat (Chalinolobus neocaledonicus) is a species of vesper bat, family Vespertilionidae. It is found only in New Caledonia.

== Taxonomy ==
The New Caledonia wattled bat was first described by Swiss naturalist Pierre Revilliod in 1914. It was formerly considered a subspecies of Gould's wattled bat (Chalinolobus gouldii), but evidence for synonymy is weak. Its species name "neocaledonicus" comes from Ancient Greek néos meaning "new" and the Neo-Latin rendering of "Caledonia," caledonicus; the species name refers to New Caledonia where this species is found.

== Description ==
It is a small species of bat, with a head and body length of only 50.5 mm (1.99 in). Its forearm is 35.3 mm (1.39 in) long, and its tail is 33 mm (1.3 in) long. Its ears are relatively long, at 12 mm (0.47 in) Its dental formula is 2.1.2.33.1.2.3, for a total of 32 teeth.

== Range and habitat ==
It is one of nine species of bat found in New Caledonia. It is among the three species of bat endemic to the territory.

== Conservation ==
It is considered endangered by the IUCN. It meets the criteria for this assessment because its area of occupancy is less than 500 km^{2} (190 mi^{2}), there are fewer than six known localities of occurrence, and its habitat is declining in quality and extent.
