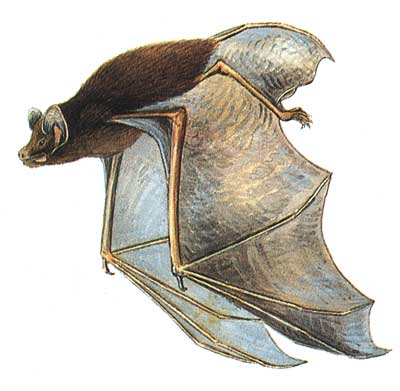
- Chocolate wattled bat (Chalinolobus morio)

Scientific classification
- Kingdom: Animalia
- Phylum: Chordata
- Class: Mammalia
- Order: Chiroptera
- Family: Vespertilionidae
- Tribe: Vespertilionini
- Genus: Chalinolobus; Peters, 1866

Type species
- Vespertilio tuberculatus Gray, 1843

= Chalinolobus =

Genus of bats

Chalinolobus is a genus of bats, commonly known as pied, wattled, or long-tailed bats. They have fleshy lobes at the bottom edge of their ears and on their lower lips. The bats otherwise classified in the genus Glauconycteris are included in Chalinolobus by select zoologists.

== Species ==
- Large-eared pied bat (Chalinolobus dwyeri)
- Gould's wattled bat (Chalinolobus gouldii)
- Chocolate wattled bat (Chalinolobus morio)
- New Caledonia wattled bat, sometimes treated as a subspecies of C. gouldii (Chalinolobus neocaledonicus)
- Hoary wattled bat (Chalinolobus nigrogriseus)
- Coastal lobe-lipped bat, or coastal wattled bat (Chalinolobus orarius)
- Little pied bat (Chalinolobus picatus)
- New Zealand long-tailed bat, or long-tailed wattled bat (Chalinolobus tuberculatus)
