= Hoary wattled bat =

Conservation status
- Least Concern (IUCN 3.1)

Scientific classification
- Kingdom: Animalia
- Phylum: Chordata
- Class: Mammalia
- Order: Chiroptera
- Family: Vespertilionidae
- Genus: Chalinolobus
- Species: C. nigrogriseus

Binomial name
- Chalinolobus nigrogriseus Gould, 1852
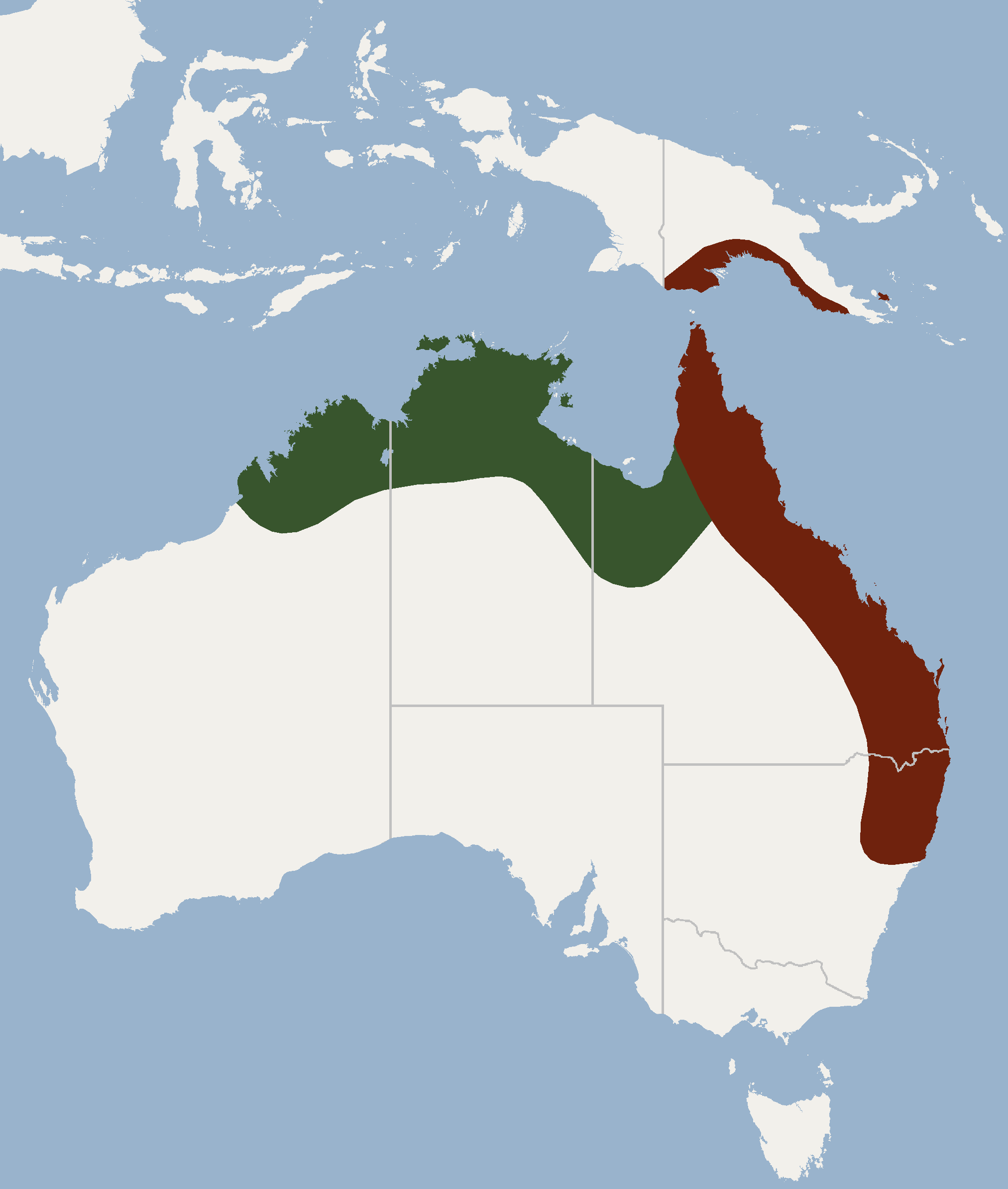
- C.n.nigrogriseus in brown, C.n.rogersi in green

Species of bat

The hoary wattled bat (Chalinolobus nigrogriseus) is a species of vesper bat found in northern Australia and Papua New Guinea. Two subspecies are currently recognised:

- C. n. nigrogriseus (Gould, 1852)
- C. n. rogersi (Thomas, 1909)
