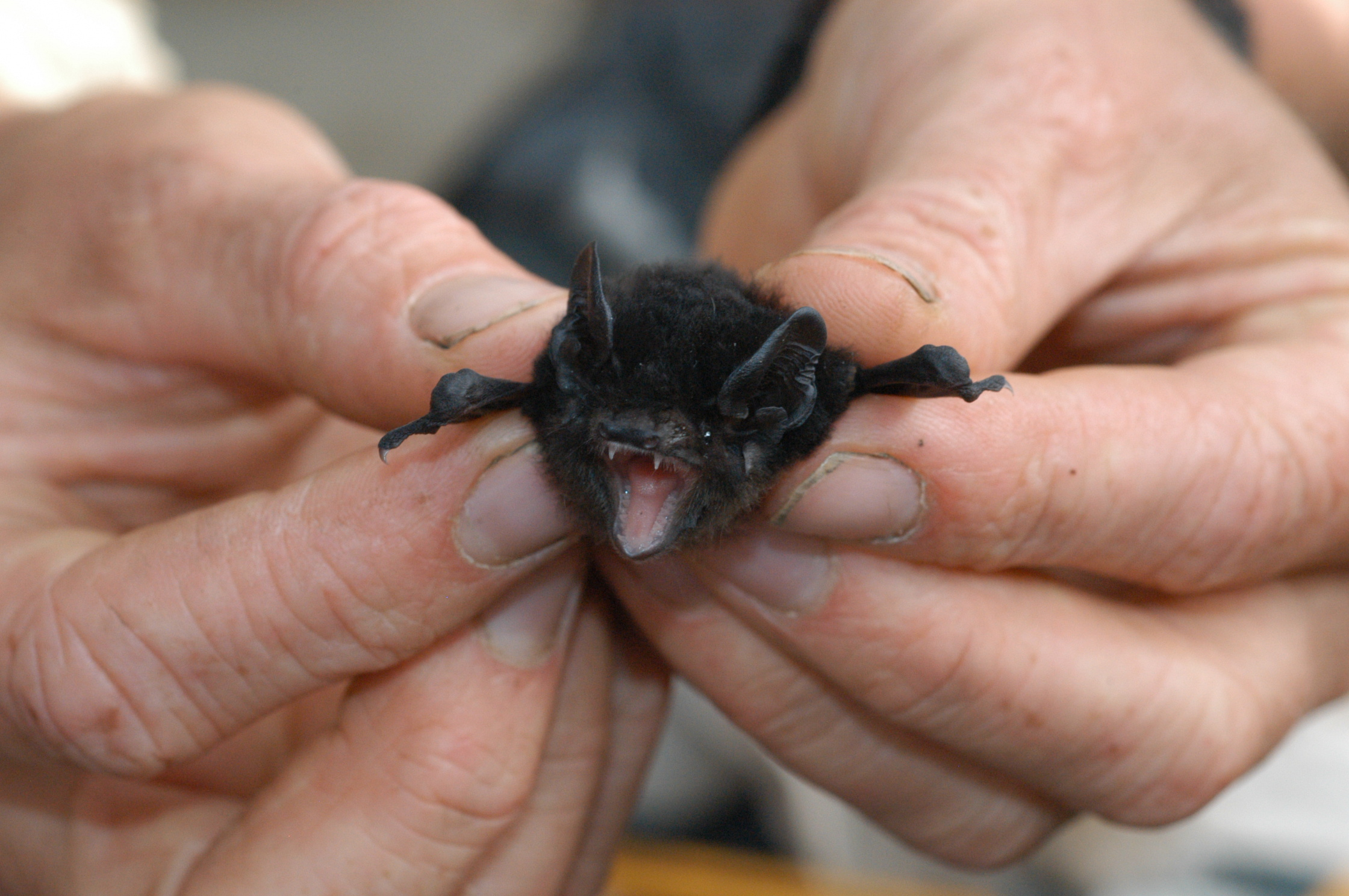

Conservation status
- Vulnerable (IUCN 3.1)

Scientific classification
- Kingdom: Animalia
- Phylum: Chordata
- Class: Mammalia
- Order: Chiroptera
- Family: Vespertilionidae
- Genus: Chalinolobus
- Species: C. dwyeri

Binomial name
- Chalinolobus dwyeri Ryan, 1966

= Large-eared pied bat =

Species of bat

The large-eared pied bat (Chalinolobus dwyeri) is a species of vesper bat in the family Vespertilionidae. It can be found in Australia. The conservation status is defined as threatened and vulnerable by the IUCN.

== See also ==
- Threatened fauna of Australia
- List of bats of Australia
