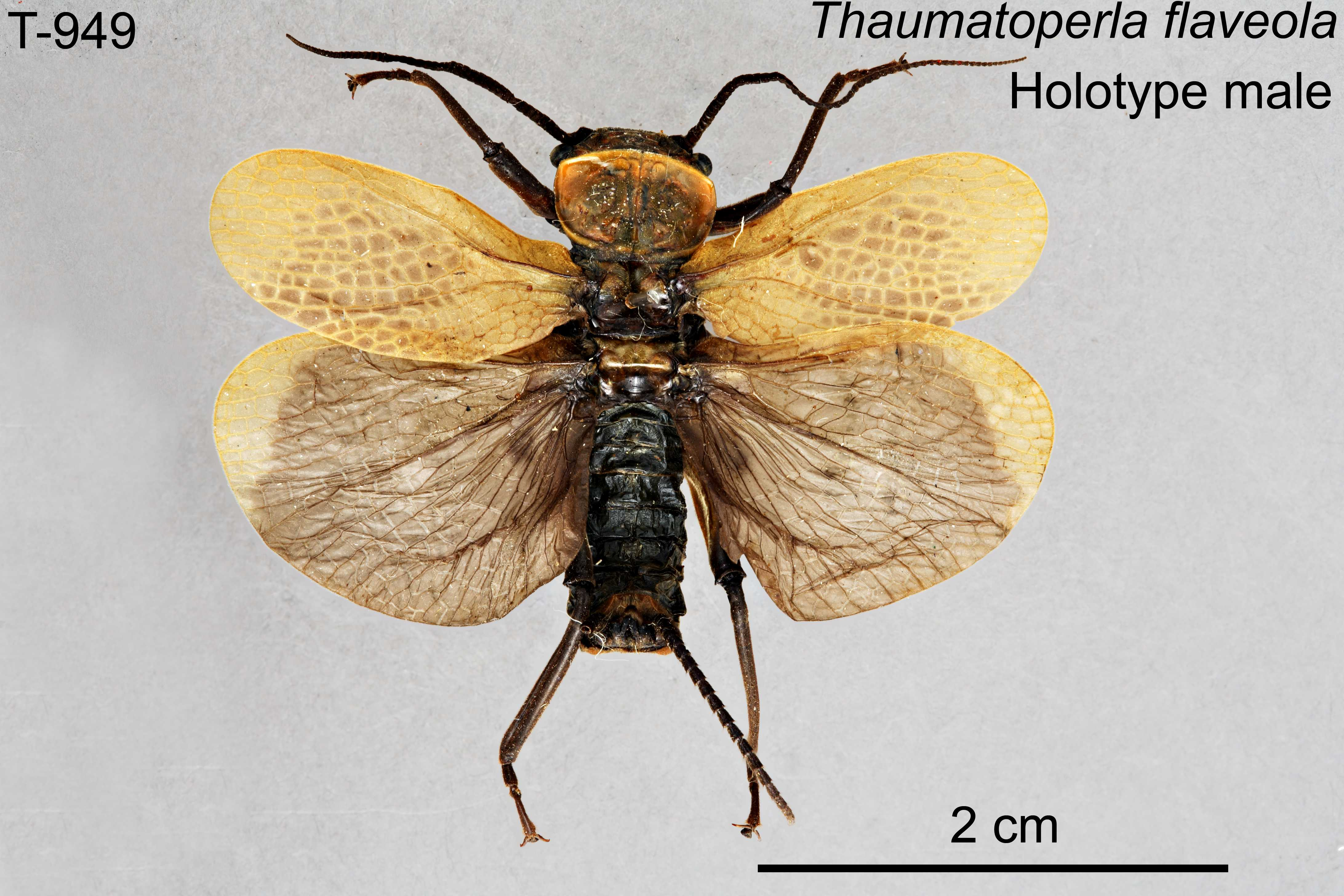
- Thaumatoperla flaveola

Scientific classification
- Kingdom: Animalia
- Phylum: Arthropoda
- Class: Insecta
- Order: Plecoptera
- Suborder: Antarctoperlaria
- Superfamily: Eusthenioidea
- Family: Eustheniidae; Tillyard, 1921

= Eustheniidae =

Family of stoneflies

Eustheniidae is a family of insects in the order Plecoptera, the stoneflies. They are native to Australia, New Zealand, and Chile.

The nymphs live in lakes and in swift-flowing rivers and streams, where they cling to rocks. They are carnivorous. They take two to three years to develop into adults.

Genera include:

- Cosmioperla McLellan, 1996
- Eusthenia Westwood, 1832
- Neuroperla Illies, 1960
- Neuroperlopsis Illies, 1960
- Stenoperla McLachlan, 1867
- Thaumatoperla Tillyard, 1921
- † Boreoperlidium Sinitshenkova, 2013
- † Stenoperlidium Tillyard, 1935
