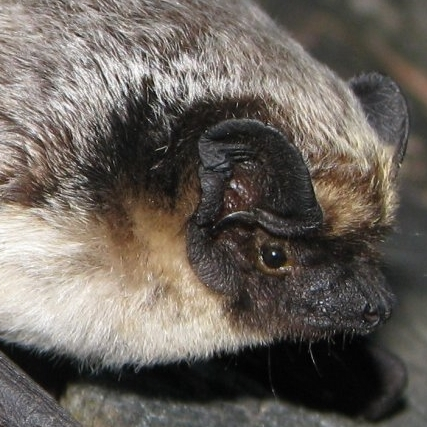
- Parti-colored bat (Vespertilio murinus)

Scientific classification
- Kingdom: Animalia
- Phylum: Chordata
- Class: Mammalia
- Order: Chiroptera
- Family: Vespertilionidae
- Subfamily: Vespertilioninae
- Tribe: Vespertilionini; Gray, 1821

Genera
- See text

= Vespertilionini =

Tribe of vesper bats

Vespertilionini is a tribe of bats in the family Vespertilionidae. The largest of the tribes in Vespertilioninae, it contains many genera found throughout the Old World and Australasia.

== Species ==
Species in the tribe include:

- Genus Afronycteris
  - Heller's serotine, Afronycteris helios
  - Banana serotine, Afronycteris nanus
- Genus Cassistrellus – helmeted bats
  - Surat helmeted bat, Cassistrellus dimissus
  - Yok Don helmeted bat, Cassistrellus yokdonensis
- Genus Chalinolobus – wattled bats
  - Large-eared pied bat, Chalinolobus dwyeri
  - Gould's wattled bat, Chalinolobus gouldii
  - Chocolate wattled bat, Chalinolobus morio
  - New Caledonian wattled bat, Chalinolobus neocaledonicus
  - Hoary wattled bat, Chalinolobus nigrogriseus
  - Little pied bat, Chalinolobus picatus
  - New Zealand long-tailed bat or long-tailed wattled bat, Chalinolobus tuberculatus
- Genus Falsistrellus – false pipistrelles
  - Western false pipistrelle, Falsistrellus mackenziei
  - Eastern false pipistrelle, Falsistrellus tasmaniensis
- Genus Hypsugo – Asian pipistrelles
  - Chocolate pipistrelle, Hypsugo affinis
  - Alashanian pipistrelle, Hypsugo alaschanicus
  - Arabian pipistrelle, Hypsugo arabicus
  - Desert pipistrelle, Hypsugo ariel
  - Bodenheimer's pipistrelle, Hypsugo bodenheimeri
  - Cadorna's pipistrelle, Hypsugo cadornae
  - Long-toothed pipistrelle, Hypsugo dolichodon
  - Brown pipistrelle, Hypsugo imbricatus
  - Red-brown pipistrelle, Hypsugo kitcheneri
  - Socotran pipistrelle or Lanza's pipistrelle, Hypsugo lanzai
  - Burma pipistrelle, Hypsugo lophurus
  - Big-eared pipistrelle, Hypsugo macrotis
  - Pungent pipistrelle, Hypsugo mordax
  - Mouselike pipistrelle, Hypsugo musciculus
  - Peters's pipistrelle, Hypsugo petersi
  - Chinese pipistrelle, Hypsugo pulveratus
  - Savi's pipistrelle, Hypsugo savii
  - Vordermann's pipistrelle, Hypsugo vordermanni
- Genus Laephotis – long-eared bats
  - Angolan long-eared bat, Laephotis angolensis
  - Botswanan long-eared bat, Laephotis botswanae
  - Cape serotine, Laeophotis capensis
  - East African serotine, Laephotis kirinyaga
  - Isalo serotine, Laephotis malagasyensis
  - Malagasy serotine, Laephotis matroka
  - Namib long-eared bat, Laephotis namibensis
  - Roberts's serotine, Laephotis robertsi
  - Stanley's serotine, Laephotis stanleyi
  - De Winton's long-eared bat, Laephotis wintoni
- Genus Mimetillus
  - Moloney's mimic bat, Mimetillus moloneyi
  - Thomas's mimic bat, Mimetillus thomasi
- Genus Mirostrellus
  - Joffre's bat, Mirostrellus joffrei
- Genus Neoromicia
  - Anchieta's serotine, Neoromicia anchietae
  - Kirindy serotine, Neoromicia bemainty
  - Yellow serotine, Neoromicia flavescens
  - Tiny serotine, Neoromicia guineensis
  - Melck's house bat, Neoromicia melckorum
  - Somali serotine, Neoromicia somalica
  - Zulu serotine, Neoromicia zuluensis
- Genus Nycticeinops
  - Bellier's serotine, Nycticeinops bellieri
  - Broad-headed serotine, Nycticeinops crassulus
  - Eisentraut's serotine, Nycticeinops eisentrauti
  - Grandidier's serotine, Nycticeinops grandidieri
  - Happolds's serotine, Nycticeinops happoldorum
  - Large-headed serotine, Nycticeinops macrocephalus
  - Schlieffen's serotine, Nycticeinops schlieffeni
- Genus Nyctophilus – New Guinean and Australian big-eared bats
  - Northern long-eared bat, Nyctophilus arnhemensis
  - Eastern long-eared bat, Nyctophilus bifax
  - South-eastern long-eared bat, Nyctophilus corbeni
  - Pallid long-eared bat, Nyctophilus daedalus
  - Lesser long-eared bat, Nyctophilus geoffroyi
  - Gould's long-eared bat, Nyctophilus gouldi
  - Sunda long-eared bat, Nyctophilus heran
  - †Lord Howe long-eared bat, Nyctophilus howensis
  - Holts' long-eared bat, Nyctophilus holtorum
  - Small-toothed long-eared bat, Nyctophilus microdon
  - New Guinea long-eared bat, Nyctophilus microtis
  - New Caledonian long-eared bat, Nyctophilus nebulosus
  - Greater long-eared bat, Nyctophilus timoriensis
  - Western long-eared bat, Nyctophilus major
  - Tasmanian long-eared bat, Nyctophilus sherrini
  - Mt. Missim long-eared bat, Nyctophilus shirleyae
  - Pygmy long-eared bat, Nyctophilus walkeri
- Genus Pharotis
  - New Guinea big-eared bat, Pharotis imogene
- Genus Philetor
  - Rohu's bat, Philetor brachypterus
- Genus Pseudoromicia
  - Dark-brown serotine, Pseudoromicia brunnea
  - Isabelline serotine, Pseudoromicia isabella
  - Kityo's serotine, Pseudoromicia kityoi
  - Nyanza serotine, Pseudoromicia nyanza
  - Rendall's serotine, Pseudoromicia rendalli
  - Rosevear's serotine, Pseudoromicia roseveari
  - White-winged serotine, Pseudoromicia tenuipinnis
- Genus Tylonycteris – bamboo bats
  - Amber bamboo bat, Tylonycteris fulvida
  - Malayan bamboo bat, Tylonycteris malayana
  - Lesser bamboo bat, Tylonycteris pachypus
  - Pygmy bamboo bat, Tylonycteris pygmaeus
  - Greater bamboo bat, Tylonycteris robustula
  - Tonkin bamboo bat, Tylonycteris tonkinensis
- Genus Vespadelus
  - Inland forest bat, Vespadelus baverstocki
  - Northern cave bat, Vespadelus caurinus
  - Large forest bat, Vespadelus darlingtoni
  - Yellow-lipped bat, Vespadelus douglasorum
  - Finlayson's cave bat, Vespadelus finlaysoni
  - Eastern forest bat, Vespadelus pumilus
  - Southern forest bat, Vespadelus regulus
  - Troughton's forest bat, Vespadelus troughtoni
  - Little forest bat, Vespadelus vulturnus
- Genus Vespertilio – frosted bats
  - Parti-coloured bat, Vespertilio murinus
  - Asian parti-colored bat, Vespertilio sinensis
