= Holts' long-eared bat =

Conservation status
- Least Concern (IUCN 3.1)

Scientific classification
- Kingdom: Animalia
- Phylum: Chordata
- Class: Mammalia
- Order: Chiroptera
- Family: Vespertilionidae
- Genus: Nyctophilus
- Species: N. holtorum

Binomial name
- Nyctophilus holtorum Parnaby, King, and Eldridge, 2021

Species of bat

The Holts' long-eared bat (Nyctophilus holtorum) is a species of bat in the family Vespertilionidae. It is endemic to Australia, where it is only found in the southwestern corner of Western Australia.

It was formerly confused with Gould's long-eared bat (N. gouldi), but a 2021 study described it as a distinct species. It closely resembles N. gouldi, but differs genetically, and the anterior of its braincase is more laterally inflated, along with a shorter overall skull. It is sympatric with the western long-eared bat (N. major) and lesser long-eared bat (N. geoffroyi).

It has a highly restricted range, perhaps the most restricted of any Australian Vespertilionidae. It is primarily found in taller marri (Corymbia calophylla) and jarrah (Eucalyptus marginata) forests with a dense shrubby understory. Habitats such as these have become threatened by heavy habitat destruction, increased frequency and intensity of bushfires, and an increasing drying trend in the area from climate change. One specimen was collected in the Australian Wheatbelt, an area that has since been cleared of almost all native vegetation, indicating that the species has likely already faced a heavy range contraction due to habitat conversion. Of the 26 locality records, only 6 are from after 1999, with these being concentrated in the Jarrah Forest and Warren bioregions. It is however unknown if this reflects a distributional decline or a decline in retention of voucher specimens. It has been proposed that the species at minimum qualifies for Vulnerable under the IUCN Red List requirements.

It was named after John Holt and Mary Holt for their support of Australian biodiversity conservation.

== See also ==
- List of living mammal species described in the 2020s
