= Surat helmeted bat =

Conservation status
- Data Deficient (IUCN 3.1)

Scientific classification
- Kingdom: Animalia
- Phylum: Chordata
- Class: Mammalia
- Order: Chiroptera
- Family: Vespertilionidae
- Genus: Cassistrellus
- Species: C. dimissus

Binomial name
- Cassistrellus dimissus (Thomas, 1916)
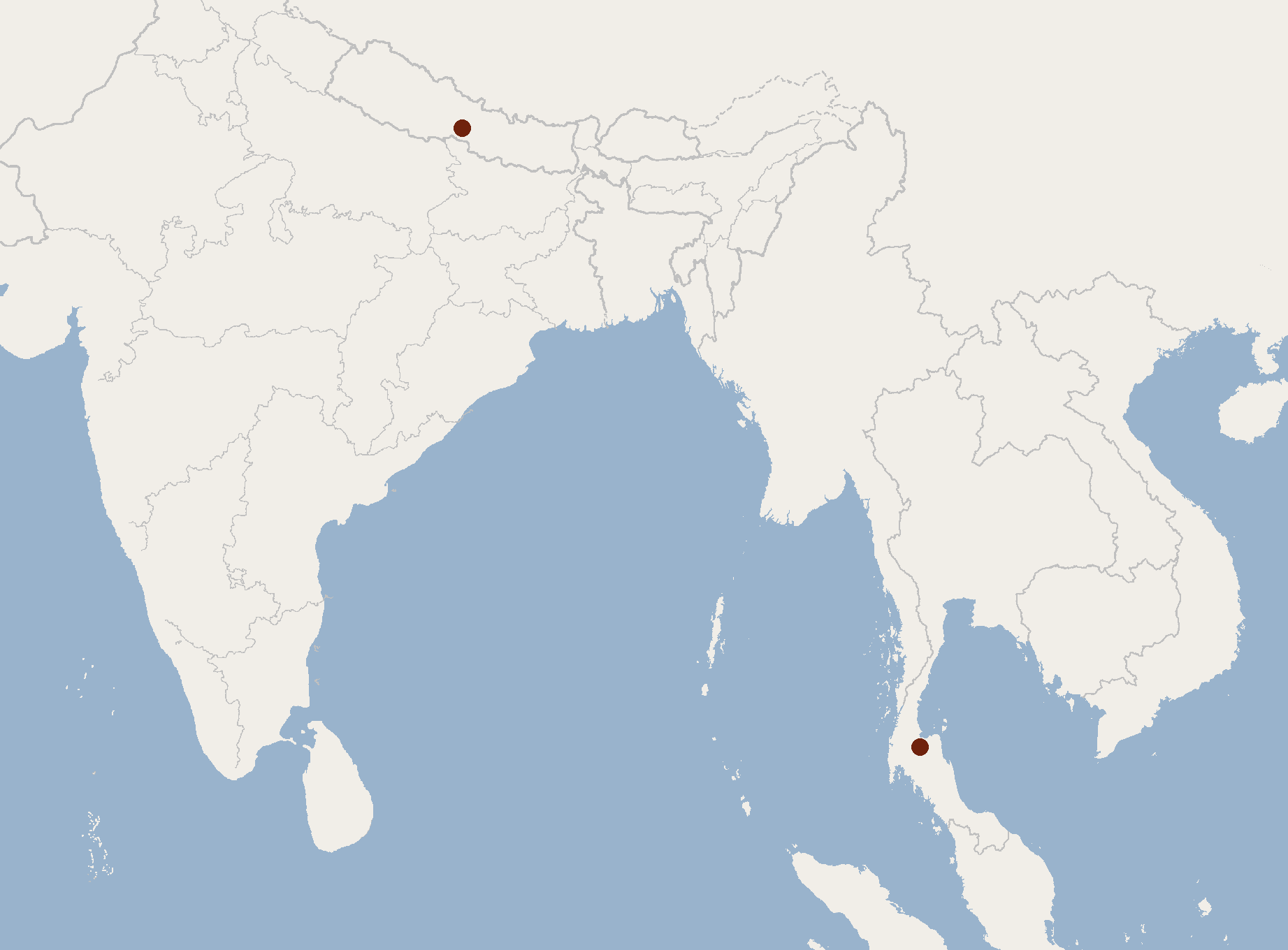

Synonyms
- Eptesicus dimissus

Species of bat

The Surat helmeted bat (Cassistrellus dimissus) is a species of vesper bat. It ranges from Thailand and Laos west to Nepal.

== Taxonomy ==
This species was formerly classified in the genus Eptesicus until phylogenetic analysis found it to belong a distinct genus in the tribe Vespertilionini, and thus reclassified it in the newly described genus Cassistrellus.

== Distribution ==
Cassistrellus dimissus has been found in Khao Nong, Tai Rom Yen National Park, Surat Thani Province, southern Thailand and in Royal Chitwan National Park, southern Nepal.
