= Western long-eared bat =

Western long-eared bat may refer to the following bat species:

- Myotis evotis, also known as long-eared myotis, found in North America
- Nyctophilus major, found in southwest Australia
