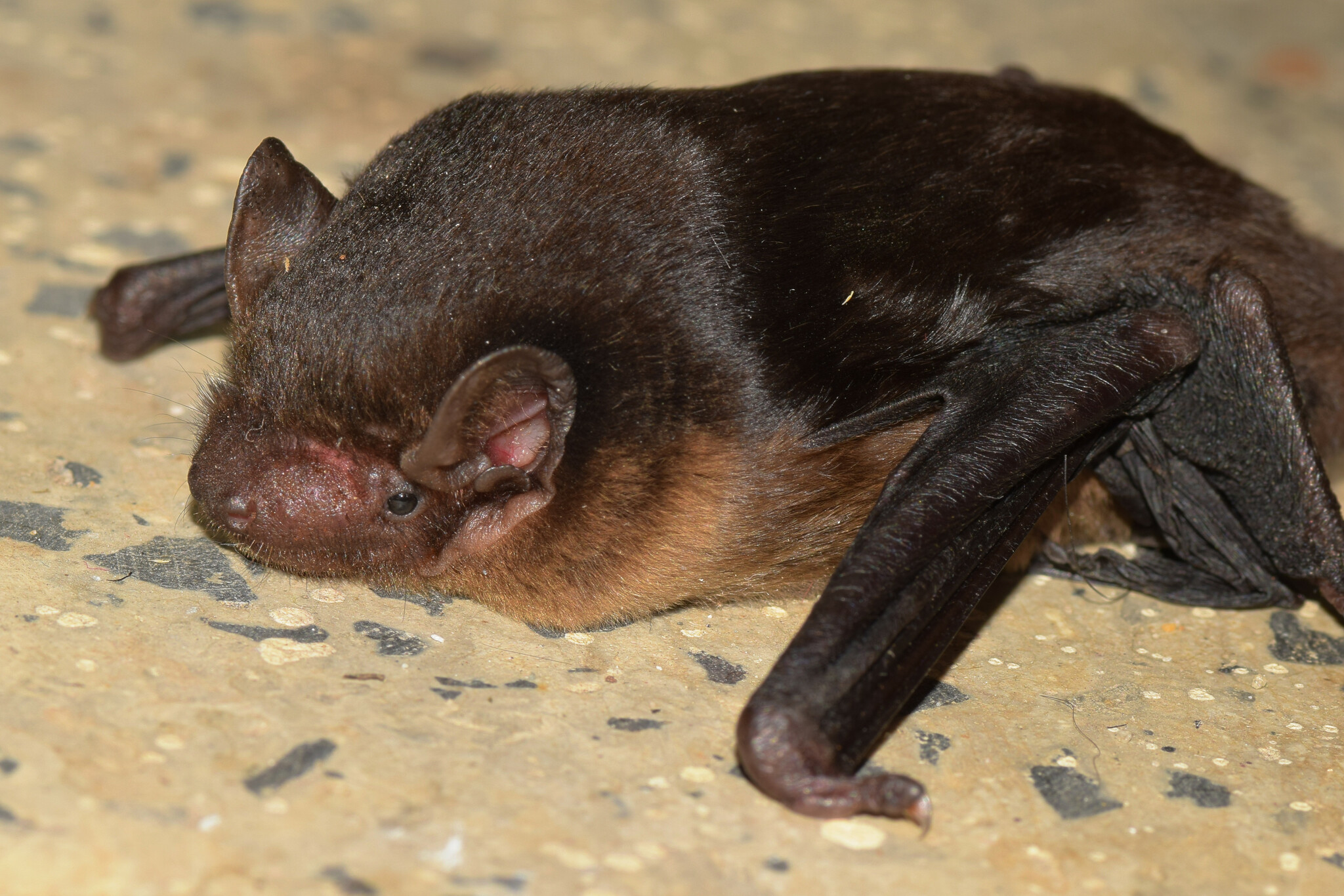

Conservation status
- Data Deficient (IUCN 3.1)

Scientific classification
- Kingdom: Animalia
- Phylum: Chordata
- Class: Mammalia
- Order: Chiroptera
- Family: Vespertilionidae
- Tribe: Vespertilionini
- Genus: Mirostrellus; Görföl, Kruskop, Tu, Estók, Son & Csorba, 2020
- Species: M. joffrei

Binomial name
- Mirostrellus joffrei (Thomas, 1915)
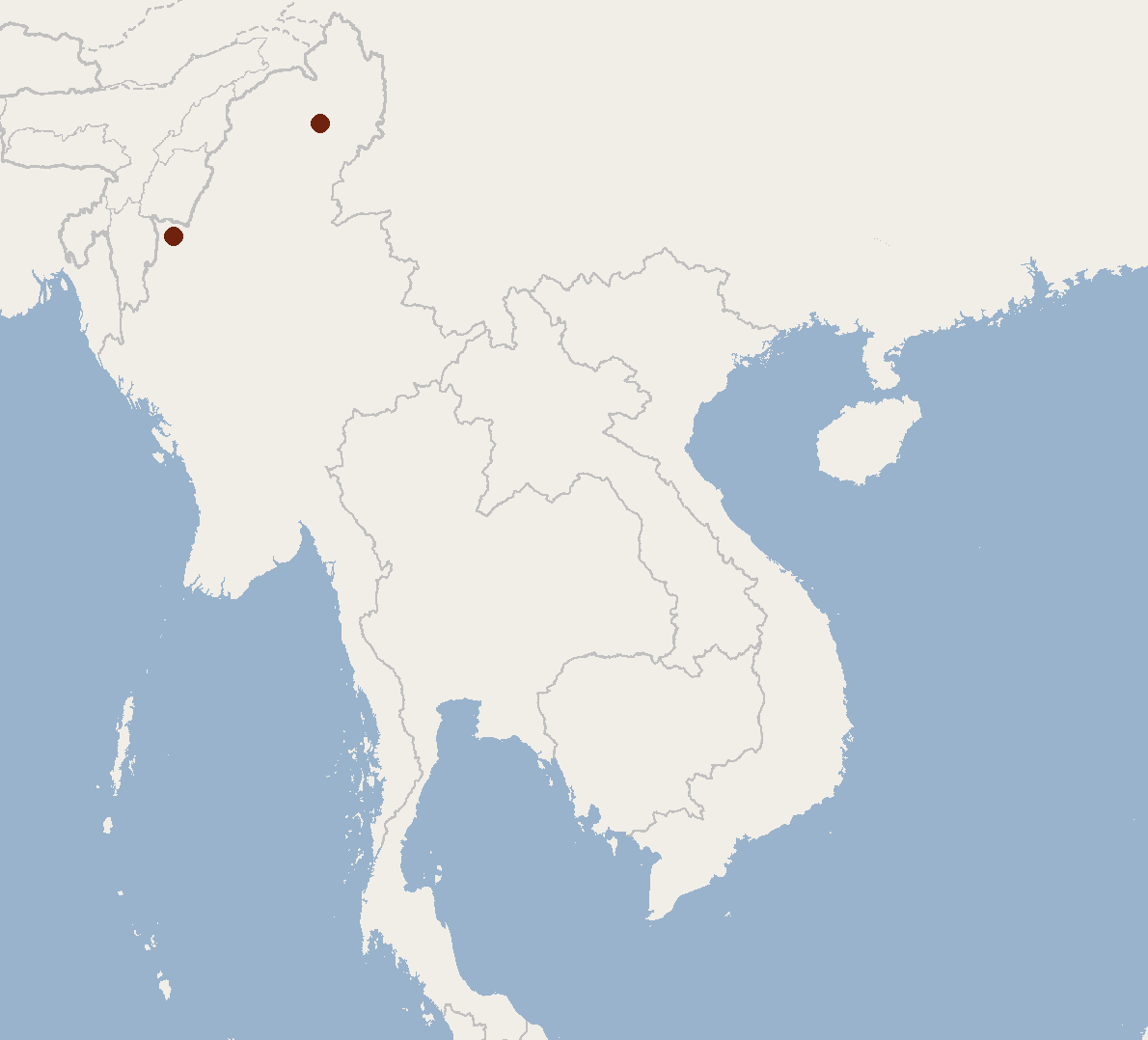

Synonyms
- Nyctalus joffrei Thomas, 1915; Pipistrellus joffrei (Thomas, 1915); Hypsugo joffrei Thomas, 1915; Hypsugo anthonyi (Tate, 1942)

= Joffre's bat =

Species of bat

Joffre's bat (Mirostrellus joffrei), also known as Joffre's pipistrelle, is a species of vesper bat in the family Vespertilionidae. It is the only member of the genus Mirostrellus. It is found in South and Southeast Asia.

It was formerly classified in the genus Hypsugo, but phylogenetic studies indicate that it belongs in its own genus, which was described in 2020 as Mirostrellus. The studies also found Anthony's pipistrelle (H. anthonyi), a mysterious bat known from a single specimen, collected at Changyinku, Burma, at 7000 ft (2134 m) altitude, to be conspecific with M. joffrei.
