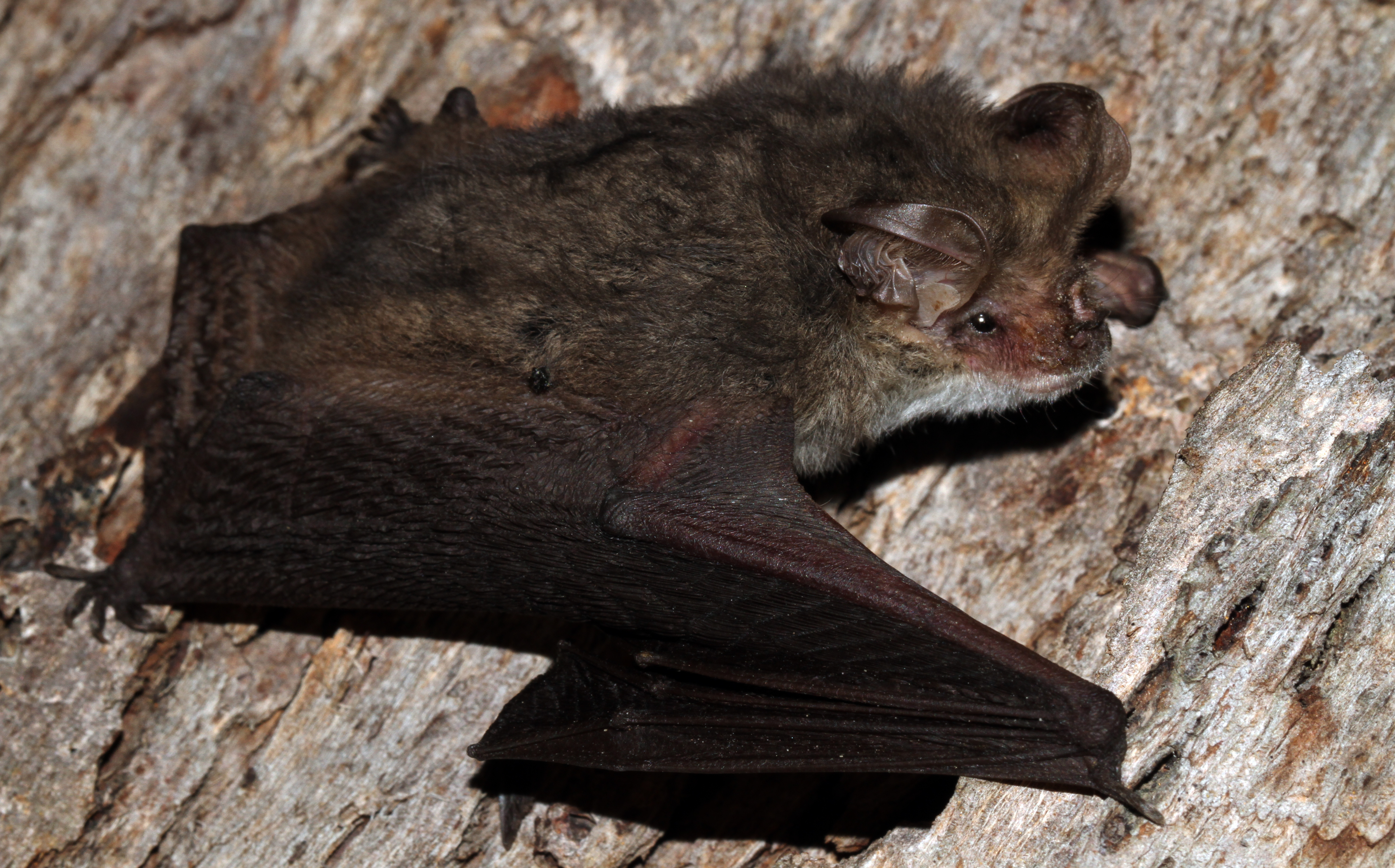
- Nyctophilus geoffroyi

Scientific classification
- Kingdom: Animalia
- Phylum: Chordata
- Class: Mammalia
- Infraclass: Placentalia
- Order: Chiroptera
- Family: Vespertilionidae
- Tribe: Vespertilionini
- Genus: Nyctophilus; Leach, 1821

Type species
- Nyctophilus geoffroyi Leach, 1821

Species
- See text

= Nyctophilus =

Genus of bats

Nyctophilus is a genus of the vespertilionids or vesper bats. They are often termed Australian big-eared bats or long-eared bats, as the length of their ears often greatly exceeds that of the head. They are sometimes colloquially called “Monbats”. This genus occurs in the New Guinean-Australian region.

== Taxonomy ==
The first description of the genus was published in 1821 by William Elford Leach. The name Nyctophilus means night-loving and is derived from the combination of Ancient Greek nyktos and philos.

The type species of the genus is Nyctophilus geoffroyi, the lesser long-eared bat. A monograph on the genus, published by Robert Fisher Tomes in 1858, cited two earlier descriptions, the species assumed by Tomes as the type for Nyctophilus geoffroyi, Leach, and incorporated the similar Vespertilio timoriensis Geoffroy as a new generic combination. Two new species were also named, Nyctophilus gouldi and Nyctophilus unicolor, both based on specimens supplied by John Gould. The availability of the name Nyctophilus timoriensis is uncertain and recognised or excluded in some treatments, following a revision and new taxa published in 2009. This followed the 2008 publication of unknown taxa noted as Nyctophilus sp., subspecies of T. timoriensis or new and separate species.

An arrangement within the family Vespertilionidae, the common evening bats, separates the genus to the subfamilial taxon Vespertilioninae and the tribe Nyctophilini, allied to the monotypic genus of Pharotis imogene, a species also found in New Guinea. A taxon proposed in 1968, Lamingtona McKean & Calaby, is a synonym for the genus. An attempt to reclassify the group as Barbastellus Gray, 1829, which the author John Edward Gray later revised to include a type in 1831, is also synonymous with Nyctophilus Leach, 1821.

The relationships between the species were first outlined in 1941, an arrangement that identified four interspecific groups. One of these alliances was the problematic timoriensis group, including the dubiously named N. timoriensis with N. major, N. sherrini and N. gouldi. Three other groups were named although with slight descriptions: bifax group (bifax and daedalus); geoffroyi group (with australis, pacificus, unicolor and pallescens); and microtis group (microtis, bicolor and walkeri).

== Description ==
A genus of the common and widely dispersed bat family Vespertilionidae, the common, evening bats. They are found in Australia, New Guinea and Indonesia, and lack extensive research into their diverse forms and habits.

The species have a body arrangement that resembles the horseshoe bat family Rhinolophidae, but distinguished by ears that exceed the length of the head. The upper half of the ear is markedly ribbed at the inner surface. The muzzle of these species is short and tail features are typical of the family. The species have small appendages at the nostrils, similar to the larger ornamented structures of bats using nasally emitted constant frequency sound in echolocation. The often plain faced vespertilionid genera use frequency modulated echolocation, emitted orally, but this genus—and possibly the North American genus Antrozous—is confirmed to use sound via the nostril apparatus.

The species may present twin births, unlike the single births of most microbat genera.

== Diversity ==
Taxa within this genus, sometimes described as 'long-eared bats', are:

- Greater long-eared bat, Nyctophilus timoriensis. A number of similar populations, tentatively distinguished or formally described, are referred to as the "Nyctophilus timoriensis complex", a group allied by similarity to this species and later typifications. Doubt regarding the type location, the epithet and author of Vespertilio timoriensis indicating the origin as Timor, was noted since early revisions of the genus.

However, this nomenclaturally uncertain taxon is provisionally excluded at the Australian Faunal Directory, which instead recognises new taxa that emerged from comparative study of molecular and morphological research (Parnaby, 2009).

- Northern long-eared bat, Nyctophilus arnhemensis
- Eastern long-eared bat, Nyctophilus bifax
- Corben's long-eared bat, Nyctophilus corbeni
  - Also known as south-eastern long-eared bat; allied to the 'greater long-eared' timoriensis complex. An uncommon bat found in the Murray-Darling Basin extending to the Dawson River catchment of the Fitzroy Basin in Queensland. Occurs in dry shrubby woodland where suitable tree hollows, decorticating trees and well defined canopy and understory provide suitable habitat. The species is most abundant in Pilliga Scrub.
- Pallid long-eared bat, Nyctophilus daedalus
- Lesser long-eared bat, Nyctophilus geoffroyi
  - Subsp. N. g. geoffroyi
  - Subsp. N. g. pacificus
  - Subsp. N. g. pallescens
- Gould's long-eared bat, Nyctophilus gouldi
- Sunda long-eared bat, Nyctophilus heran
- Holt's long-eared bat, Nyctophilus holtorum
- † Lord Howe long-eared bat, Nyctophilus howensis (extinct)
- Western long-eared bat, Nyctophilus major
  - Subsp. N. m. major
  - Subsp. N. m. tor
- Small-toothed long-eared bat, Nyctophilus microdon
- New Guinea long-eared bat, Nyctophilus microtis
- New Caledonian long-eared bat, Nyctophilus nebulosus
- Tasmanian long-eared bat, Nyctophilus sherrini
- Mt. Missim long-eared bat, Nyctophilus shirleyae
- Pygmy long-eared bat, Nyctophilus walkeri

Populations identified as Nyctophilus include unnamed species (Andrews, 2015),

- Nyctophilus sp, undescribed, central long-eared bat; a distinct form, also resembling those of the timoriensis complex. A microbat found in semi-arid regions of Western Australia, from the Goldfields district to the Eyre Peninsula. The flight is a agile fluttering patrol, as with others of the complex, but is also noted as surveying from a perch and taking prey at the ground. They favour grasslands, such as spinifex, and wood or shrublands and mallee habitat. They reside in foliage, hollows, and under bark. They have been observed at the Nullarbor National Park in South Australia, and Western Australian nature reserves Nuytsland and Dundas.
