= Helmeted bat =

Scientific classification
- Domain: Eukaryota
- Kingdom: Animalia
- Phylum: Chordata
- Class: Mammalia
- Order: Chiroptera
- Family: Vespertilionidae
- Tribe: Vespertilionini
- Genus: Cassistrellus; Ruedi, Eger, Kim & Csorba, 2017

Species
- C. dimissus C. yokdonensis

Species of bat

The helmeted bats are two species of vesper bat in the genus Cassistrellus. They are found in South and Southeast Asia.

The two species in this genus are:

- Surat helmeted bat, Cassistrellus dimissus
- Yok Don helmeted bat, Cassistrellus yokdonensis

Of these, C. dimissus was initially classified in Eptesicus until phylogenetic studies affirmed its distinctiveness, while C. yokdonesis was described in the same study that described the new genus.
