= William Robert Sherrin =

Botanist (1871-1955)

William Robert Sherrin (20 May 1871 – 22 March 1955) was a British scientific collector, taxidermist, and amateur botanist. He was employed at the British Museum of Natural History from 1895 to 1947.

== Early life ==
Sherrin was born on 20 May 1871 in Twickenham as the son of John Sherrin and Decima Vaughan Blunt. He was one of seven children: five sons and two daughters. He attended the Taplow Grammar School, and was noted to be skilled at painting and drawing. At age 8, Sherrin and his family moved to Ramsgate. He was described as "weakly" and "delicate", and was thus recommended to spend much time outdoors. As a young adult, he opened and operated a taxidermy shop in Ramsgate.

== Career ==
=== British Museum of Natural History ===
Sherrin's skill at taxidermy led to his appointment as an "articulator" (one who reassembles animal skeletons) at the British Museum of Natural History's Zoological Department in 1895. He was employed in the Department until 1928, though from 1919-1928 he was a part-time employee. In 1928, he transferred to the Department of Botany at a part-time assistant, where he would remain until 1947, when he finally retired. All told, he was employed at the British Museum for 52 years. After retiring, he was awarded a Civil List pension. While at the British Museum, Sherrin had two mammal species named in his honor. British zoologist Oldfield Thomas named the Tasmanian long-eared bat (Nyctophilus sherrini) after him. Of Sherrin, Thomas wrote, "every mammalogist who has visited the Museum is indebted [to him] for assistance . . . [his] admirable preparation of tiny skulls and tinier bacula has so immensely helped in the mammalian work done both by staff and visitors." Robert Charles Wroughton named a species of gerbil after him, Tatera sherrini, in 1917, saying that Sherrin "has given such invaluable assistance in organising the storage of the Survey material." However, T. sherrini has since been recognized as a synonym of Tatera indica.

=== Botanical work ===
Sherrin was made the secretary and curator of the South London Botanical Institute in 1919. Sherrin had great interest in mosses, and was a member of the Moss Exchange Club from 1905. Allegedly, one of the reasons for his love of mosses was that they were often used to pack zoological specimens for transport. He later joined the successor of the Moss Exchange Club, the British Bryological Society; in 1948, he was elected as an Honorary Member of the Society. He was the first curator of the British Bryological Society's Herbarium, from 1925 until 1947. He was considered an authority on Sphagnum species. He illustrated moss specimens for his booklet Study of Mosses in the London District, which was published in 1916 by the School Nature Study Union. He also published An Illustrated Handbook of the British Sphagna. He was the author of several research publications on mosses, including "Revision of the genus Spiridens." From 1947-1948, he served as the president of the British Bryological Society.

Sherrin had a passion for collecting moss specimens, and would lead amateur and professional botanists on "rambles" in search of mosses. In his obituary, P.W. Richards and E.C. Wallace wrote, "Like the good sphagnologist he was, Sherrin was not afraid of wet feet and when taking a party through the boggy ground at Oxshott or elsewhere would lead firmly forward through the wettest places rather than look for a way round."

== Memberships and recognition ==
In 1919, Sherrin was elected an Associate Honoris causa of the Linnean Society of London. He was also an honorary member of the Botanical Society of the British Isles and the Zoological Society of London.

Sherrin was remembered by his colleagues as highly successful, a "born teacher", and an "admirable" general naturalist and field botanist. Job Edward Lousley stated that "Sherrin transformed the collections of the South London Botanical Institute to such an extent that few people using them today can realise how much they owe to his efforts."

== Personal life and death ==
Sherrin was twice married; his first wife died in 1938. He had at least two children, as he was survived by a son and a daughter. Sherrin died on 22 March 1955 in London after a long illness.
