= John Holt (veterinarian) =

Australian veterinarian and sports shooter (1931–2013)

Personal information
- Born: 7 March 1931 Sydney, New South Wales, Australia
- Died: 24 June 2013 (aged 82) Mount Wilson, New South Wales, Australia
- Occupation: Veterinarian

Sport
- Sport: Sports shooting

John Holt (7 March 1931 – 24 June 2013) was an Australian veterinarian and sports shooter, who was the president of the World Small Animal Veterinary Association, co-founded its Australian chapter, and represented Australia at the 1960 Rome Olympics.

== Biography ==
Holt was born on 7 March 1931 in Sydney. He graduated with a Bachelor of Veterinary Science from the University of Sydney in 1954 and then worked briefly as a cattle veterinarian and had a short career in the animal industry. In 1959 he purchased St George Animal Hospital, which specialised in treating pets at a time when many vets preferred working with larger animals; his business eventually expanded to six practices around Sydney and produced eight university professors. He cofounded the Small Animal Clinicians Group in 1967, which was later known as the Australian Small Animal Veterinary Association and was eventually merged into the Australian Veterinary Association, and financed and edited its journal, the Australian Veterinary Practitioner. He often travelled to North America to learn about veterinary practices relating to small animals there and was a guest lecturer at institutions including the University of Guelph in Canada and the Washington State University College of Veterinary Medicine. He was the president of the World Small Animal Veterinary Association from 1986 to 1988. He strongly supported the campaign against live animal export.

In sports shooting, he competed in the 300 metre rifle, three positions event at the 1960 Summer Olympics. His brother Neville represented Australia in shooting at the 1948 London Olympics, and he and John participated together in the 2000 Summer Olympics torch relay.

He married Mary, a pharmacist, in 1960. They have both been noted patrons of animal- and biodiversity-related causes (for which Mary received a Medal of the Order of Australia in the 2024 King's Birthday Honours), along with the Australian Brandenburg Orchestra. He died aged 82 on 24 June 2013 in the Blue Mountains village of Mount Wilson; he was privately cremated.

== Recognition ==
Holt received the World Small Animal Veterinary Association's Award for Service to the Profession in 1998, a Waltham Award for International Service from the American Academy of Veterinary Nutrition, and honorary memberships in several organisations such as the American Animal Hospital Association. In 1973 he received the Australian Small Animal Veterinary Association's inaugural Practitioner of the Year Award and in 2007 the organisation gave him a special award for Meritorious Service and named its distinguished service award in his honour.

In 2014, the year after his death, Holt's wife Mary established the Dr John Holt Scholarship for Animal Welfare at the University of Sydney School of Veterinary Science in his honour, with an initial $135,000 gift. In 2021, Holts' long-eared bat (Nyctophilus holtorum) was named in honour of Holt and Mary for their support of Australian biodiversity conservation.
