= Neville Holt (sport shooter) =

Australian sports shooter

Personal information
- Born: 9 March 1912
- Died: 6 February 2008 (aged 95) Sydney, Australia

Sport
- Sport: Sports shooting

Neville Holt (9 March 1912 – 6 February 2008) was an Australian sports shooter. His father introduced him to the sport, and before World War II he joined the Australian Militia, from which he borrowed guns to practise; he never served in the war. He competed in the 50 m rifle event at the 1948 Summer Olympics, where he came 47th; despite primarily being a full-bore shooter, he competed in a small-bore event.

He worked as an electrician in Sydney, where he died on 6 February 2008. He was recognised as Australia's oldest Olympian and, upon his death, this mantle was taken by Australian equestrian gold medallist Bill Roycroft. His brother John, a noted veterinarian, represented Australia in shooting at the 1960 Rome Olympics, and he and Neville participated together in the 2000 Summer Olympics torch relay.
