= Nyctophilini =

Scientific classification
- Kingdom: Animalia
- Phylum: Chordata
- Class: Mammalia
- Order: Chiroptera
- Family: Vespertilionidae
- Subfamily: Vespertilioninae
- Tribe: Nyctophilini; Peters, 1865.

Tribe of bats

Nyctophilini is a taxonomic group of bat species, a tribe of the vespertilionid subfamily Vespertilioninae. The alliance isolates two genera, Nyctophilus and Pharotis, referred to as the large-eared bats for the size of these proportionate to the head. Phylogenetic evidence indicates that this tribe is synonymous with Vespertilionini, and thus its genera are now placed there.

== Taxonomy ==
The first description of the taxon was published in 1865 by Wilhelm Peters.
