= Swamp paperbark =

Swamp paperbark is a common name for several plants and may refer to:

- Melaleuca ericifolia, a species of tree or shrub from eastern Australia
- Melaleuca halmaturorum, a species of tree from Western Australia
- Melaleuca rhaphiophylla, a tree species from Western Australia
