= New Guinea long-eared bat =

Conservation status
- Least Concern (IUCN 3.1)

Scientific classification
- Kingdom: Animalia
- Phylum: Chordata
- Class: Mammalia
- Order: Chiroptera
- Family: Vespertilionidae
- Genus: Nyctophilus
- Species: N. microtis

Binomial name
- Nyctophilus microtis Thomas, 1888
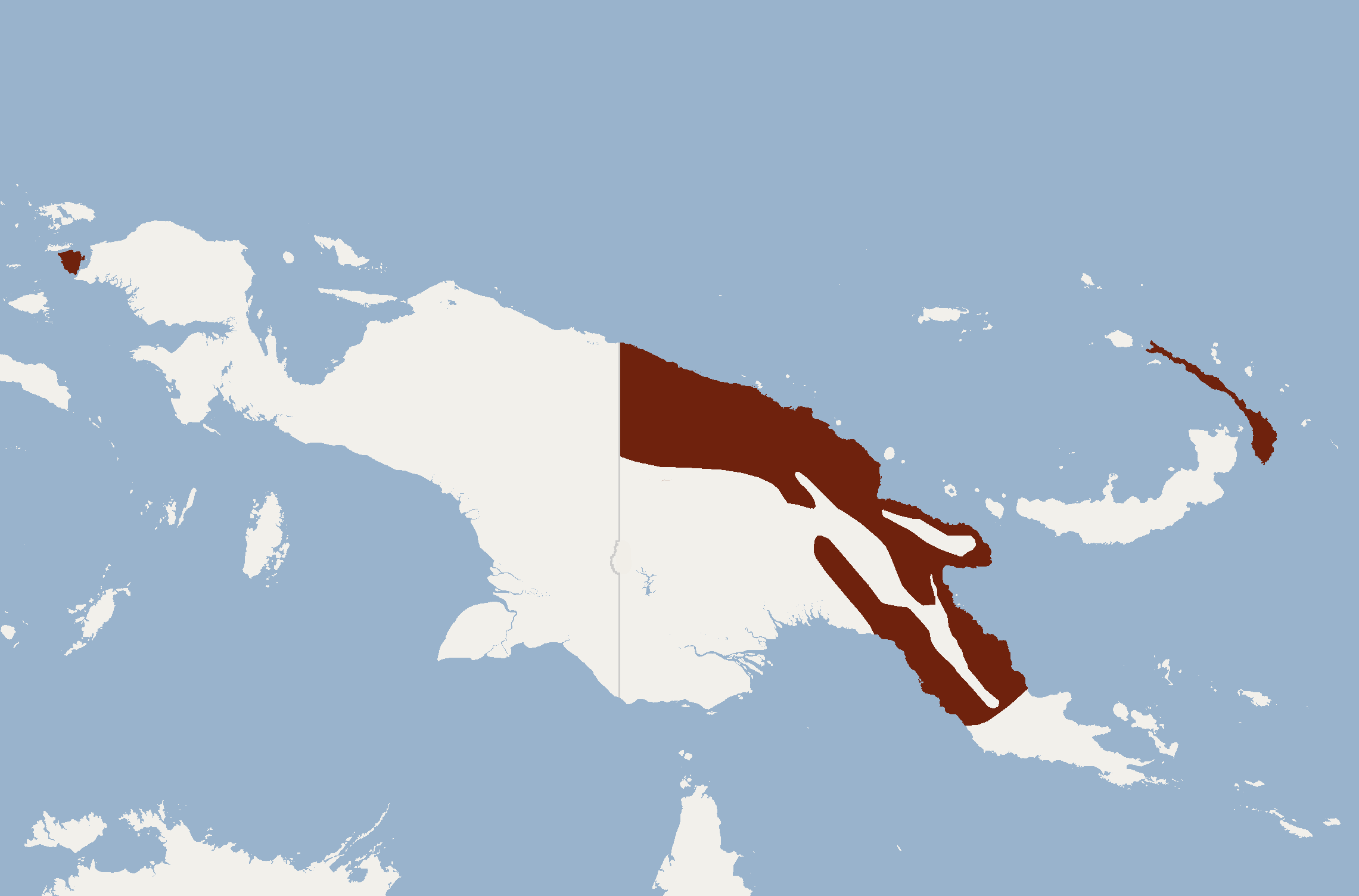

Species of bat

The New Guinea long-eared bat (Nyctophilus microtis) is a small species of bat. It is found only in Papua New Guinea.

== Taxonomy ==
The description of the species was published by Oldfield Thomas in 1888, recognising the affinity with Nyctophilus timoriensis, the name ascribed to Australian vespertilionid 'long-eared bat' taxa. Thomas's description of a new species in the genus Nyctophilus was the first to indicate the diversity of the group, previously described as monotypic. The specimen is noted as having been collected at Sogere, South-east New Guinea by Henry Ogg Forbes, and deposited at the British Museum of Natural History, London.
