= Nyctophilus daedalus =

Pallid long-eared bat

Conservation status
- Least Concern (IUCN 3.1)

Scientific classification
- Kingdom: Animalia
- Phylum: Chordata
- Class: Mammalia
- Order: Chiroptera
- Family: Vespertilionidae
- Genus: Nyctophilus
- Species: N. daedalus

Binomial name
- Nyctophilus daedalus Thomas, 1915

Synonyms
- Nyctophilus bifax daedalus

Species of bat

Nyctophilus daedalus is a species of bat in the family Vespertilionidae, a flying mammal endemic to northern Australia. They are also referred to as the pallid long-eared bat or northern long-eared bat.

== Taxonomy ==
High levels of morphological variation within the species indicate that it is a composite of a number of distinct forms.

The description for this species was published by Oldfield Thomas in 1915. The taxon emerged from the author's reëxamination of the genus Nyctophilus, seen as allied to his description of a new genus Pharotis. The taxon was recognised as a species by Tom Iredale and Troughton, but later authors assigned it as a synonym or subspecies of Nyctophilus bifax or Nyctophilus gouldi.

The author's type specimen was collected at Daly River in the Northern Territory. This type, a male, was provided to the author by the Christiania Museum (Oslo Museum), and notes the collection by Knut Dahl in July 1894. Two other specimens were examined, Thomas reporting their locations as Melville Island and Port Essington.

The common name northern long-eared bat also refers to another species of the 'long-eared bats', Nyctophilus arnhemensis.

== Description ==
Similar in habit and appearance to the species Nyctophilus bifax, to which it was earlier placed as a subspecies, but distinguished for a preference to wetter forest environments. They are recorded using perches when seeking prey. As with N. bifax, the superficial appearance is brown fur at the back, ranging in colour from light to dark, and notably paler fur on their bellies. There are minor fleshy protuberances behind the nostrils, and little of the ridge feature of the nostrils found in other nyctophilus species. The forearm (tibia) measurement is 37 to 46 millimetres in length, and their weight ranges from 7 to 13 grams.

== Distribution and habitat ==
The species is found in the Top End, and at the Kimberley and Pilbara regions in the north west of the continent. The population in the Pilbara is geographically remote. The wetter forest types associated with the species include monsoon forest and riparian habitat. They select roosts in tree hollows and beneath the foliage of trees, especially near the base of pandanus leaves.

A population occurs within a park near the territory's capital Darwin, at the Holmes Jungle Nature Park.
