= Tasmanian long-eared bat =

Conservation status
- Vulnerable (IUCN 3.1)

Scientific classification
- Kingdom: Animalia
- Phylum: Chordata
- Class: Mammalia
- Order: Chiroptera
- Family: Vespertilionidae
- Genus: Nyctophilus
- Species: N. sherrini

Binomial name
- Nyctophilus sherrini Thomas, 1915
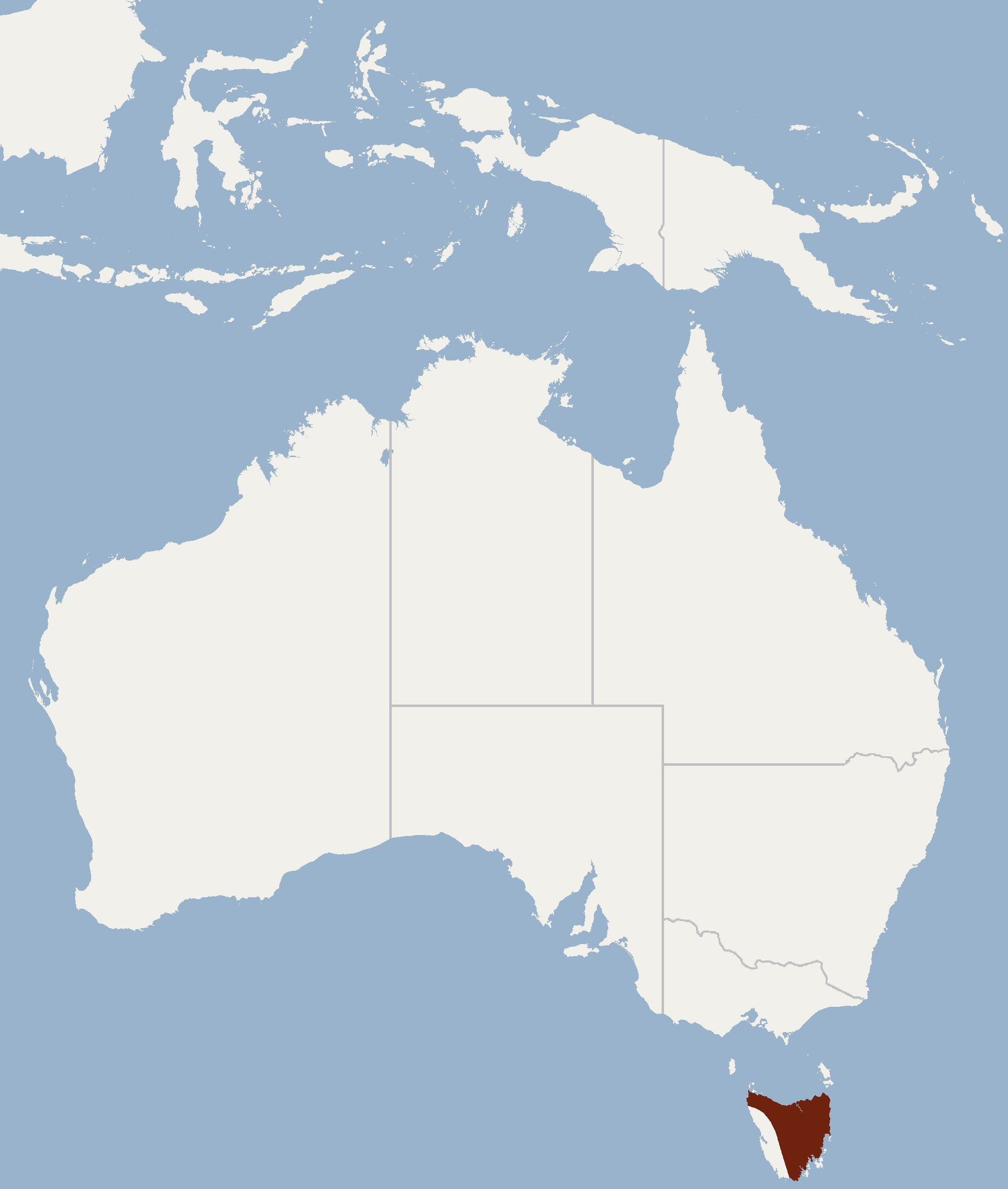
- Range map

Species of bat

The Tasmanian long-eared bat (Nyctophilus sherrini) is a species of vesper bat endemic to Tasmania.

== Taxonomy and etymology ==
It was described as a new species in 1915 by British zoologist Oldfield Thomas. The holotype was collected by Ronald Campbell Gunn. The eponym for the species name "sherrini" was William Robert Sherrin. Of Sherrin, Thomas wrote, "every mammalogist who has visited the Museum is indebted [to him] for assistance . . . [his] admirable preparation of tiny skulls and tinier bacula has so immensely helped in the mammalian work done both by staff and visitors."

It was largely considered a synonym of the greater long-eared bat until approximately 2009.

== Description ==
It can be differentiated from other Nyctophilus species by its unique combination of traits: a large size, larger third molars, and a more narrow skull. Additionally, it has a narrow snout, expanded braincase, and fairly large auditory bullae. It has a forearm length of 44.3–46.4 mm (1.74–1.83 in), and individuals weigh 9.8–18.9 g (0.35–0.67 oz). Its ears are large relative to its body, at 27.2–29.8 mm (1.07–1.17 in) long. It has a dental formula of 1.1.1.33.1.2.3 for a total of 30 teeth.

== Range and habitat ==
The Tasmanian long-eared bat is found throughout Tasmania. The IUCN states that it is absent from southwestern Tasmania, though Parnaby states that its range includes the coastal southwest, though there are few recorded instances in this region. It is founded in forests.

== Conservation ==
As of 2020, it is evaluated as a vulnerable species by the IUCN. Its current population trend is likely decreasing.
