= Mount Missim long-eared bat =

Conservation status
- Data Deficient (IUCN 3.1)

Scientific classification
- Kingdom: Animalia
- Phylum: Chordata
- Class: Mammalia
- Order: Chiroptera
- Family: Vespertilionidae
- Genus: Nyctophilus
- Species: N. shirleyae

Binomial name
- Nyctophilus shirleyae Parnaby, 2009
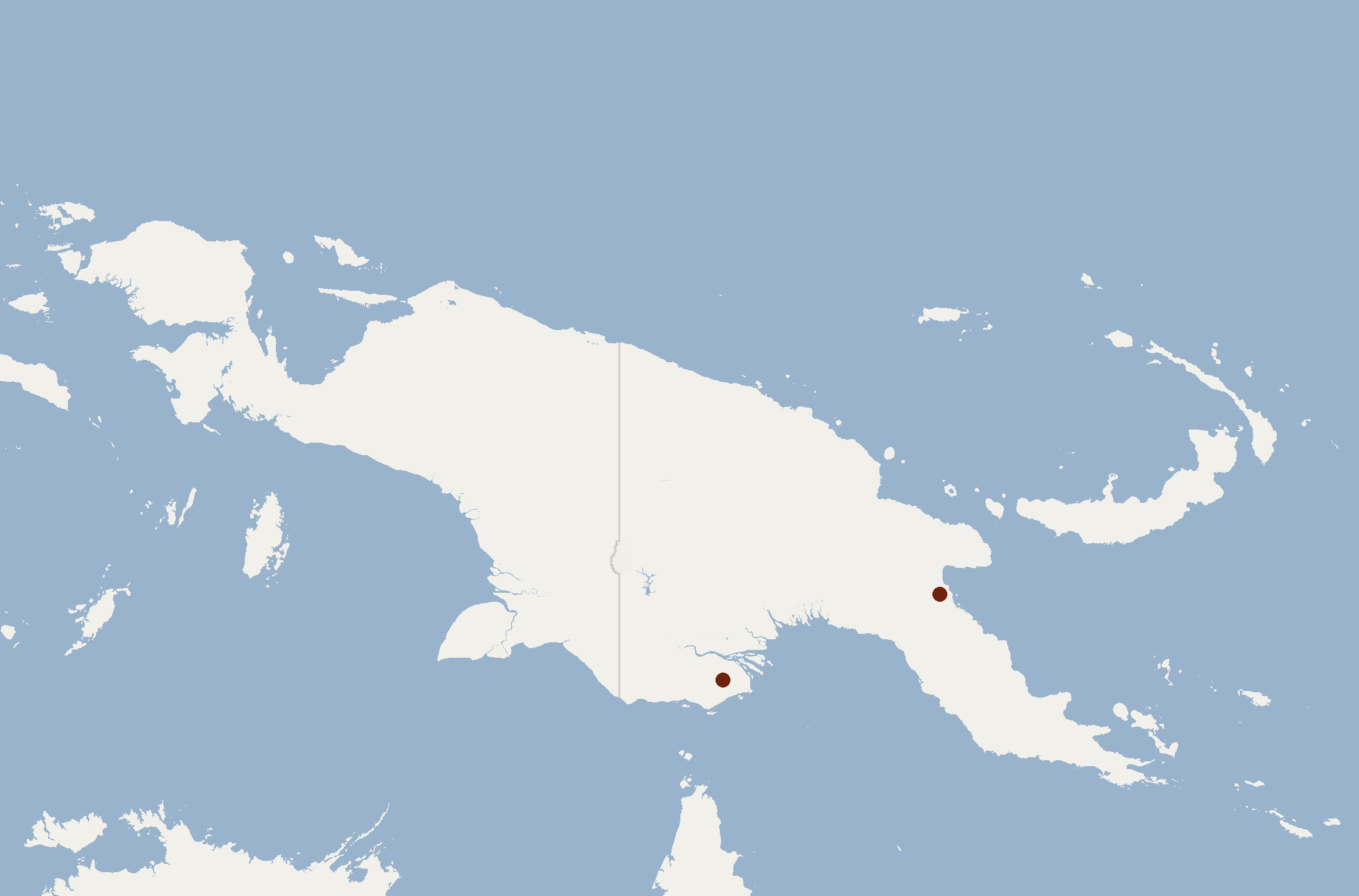
- Distribution of the Mount Missim long-eared bat

Species of bat

The Mount Missim long-eared bat (Nyctophilus shirleyae) is a species of vesper bat found in Papua New Guinea.

== Taxonomy and etymology ==
The Mount Missim long-eared bat was described as a new species by H. Parnaby in 2009. The holotype had been collected in 1988 on Mount Missim by H. Parnaby. The eponym for the species name "shirleyae" was H. Parnaby's mother, Shirley Jean Parnaby. H. Parnaby wrote that she was "a great admirer of the people of the Papua New Guinea nation and its biodiversity," in addition to a supporter of his childhood interest in mammals.

== Description ==
Its forearm length is approximately 46.8 mm (1.84 in). Individuals weigh 11.5–13 g (0.41–0.46 oz).

== Range and habitat ==
It is endemic to Papua New Guinea. It has been documented at elevations between 500–1,700 m (1,600–5,600 ft) above sea level.

== Conservation ==
As of 2020, it is assessed as a data deficient species by the IUCN.
