= Sunda long-eared bat =

Conservation status
- Data Deficient (IUCN 3.1)

Scientific classification
- Kingdom: Animalia
- Phylum: Chordata
- Class: Mammalia
- Order: Chiroptera
- Family: Vespertilionidae
- Genus: Nyctophilus
- Species: N. heran

Binomial name
- Nyctophilus heran Kitchener, How & Maharadatunkamsi, 1991

Species of bat

The Sunda long-eared bat (Nyctophilus heran) is a species of vesper bat. It is found only in Indonesia.
