= Small-toothed long-eared bat =

Conservation status
- Least Concern (IUCN 3.1)

Scientific classification
- Kingdom: Animalia
- Phylum: Chordata
- Class: Mammalia
- Order: Chiroptera
- Family: Vespertilionidae
- Genus: Nyctophilus
- Species: N. microdon

Binomial name
- Nyctophilus microdon Laurie & Hill, 1954
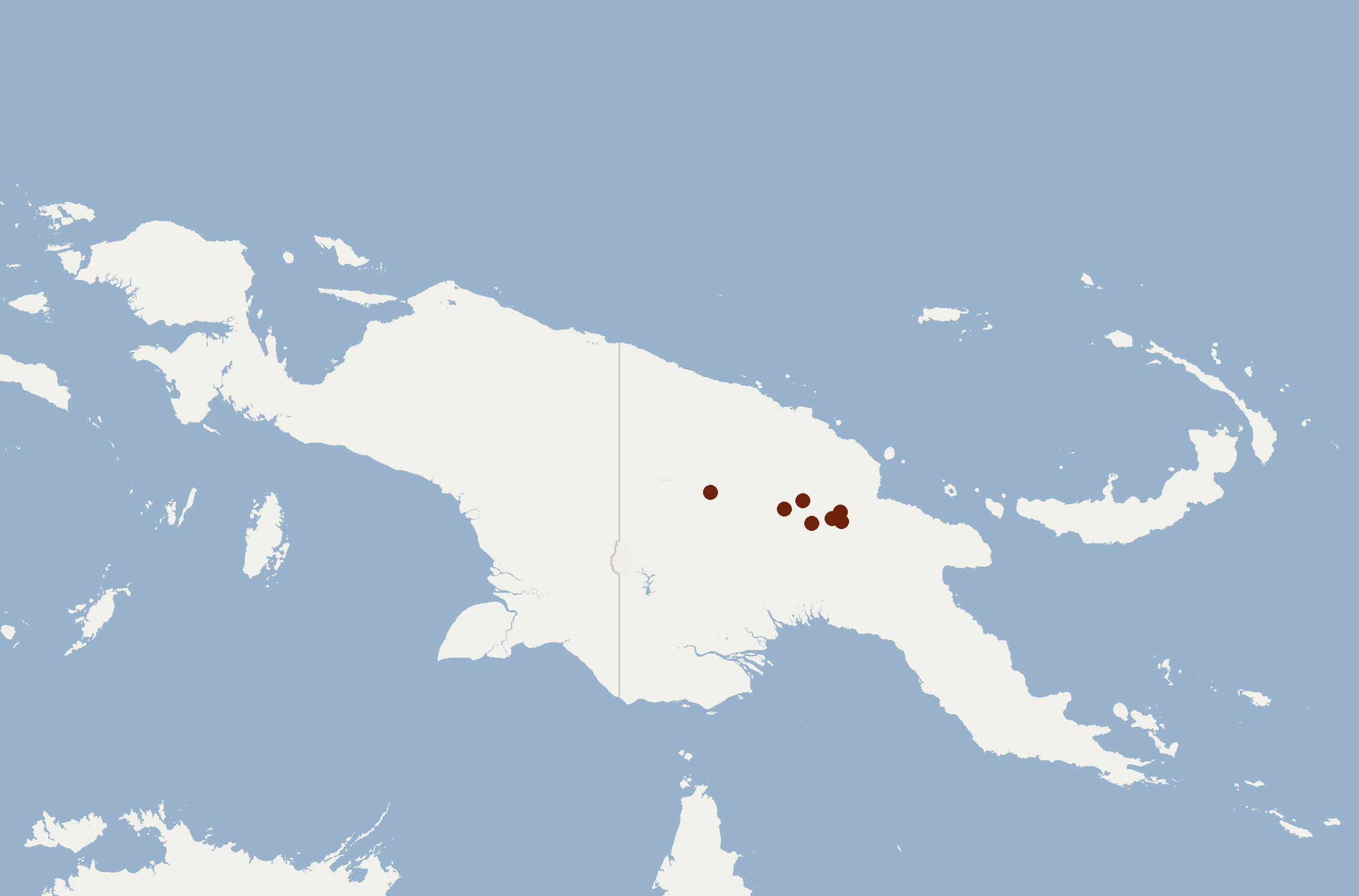

Species of bat

The small-toothed long-eared bat (Nyctophilus microdon) is a species of vespertilionid bat found only in Papua New Guinea.

== Taxonomy ==
A species of genus Nyctophilus (large-eared bats), allied to the common bat family Vespertilionidae, the description for which was first published in 1954. The common names include small-toothed long-eared—or small-toothed—bat.

== Description ==
A poorly known species known at only seven locations, at altitudes between 1900 and 2200 metres asl. Few specimens have been obtained, and the IUCN notes that lack of study on ecology, threats, population and distribution. It is presumed to be vulnerable to habitat clearing. The roost sites are trees and caves, inhabited individually or as small groups. It is presumed to glean insects in montane forest.

== Conservation status ==
In 2008, the species was considered "Data Deficient", but in 2021 it was reassessed as being of "Least Concern", with its high elevation habitats being relatively intact.
