= List of bats of Australia =

This is the list of bats of Australia, a sub-list of the list of mammals of Australia. About 81 bat species are known to occur in Australia, Lord Howe and Christmas Island. This list principally follows the authoritative references, the Australian Faunal Directory, Churchill (2008), and the Australasian Bat Society.

Bats are all of the order Chiroptera.

Each listing includes the conservation status of the animal, following the information set out by the IUCN Red List (v. 2024-2; as at 24 December 2024). The conservation categories are:

- EX – Extinct;
- EW – Extinct in the wild;
- CR – Critically endangered;
- EN – Endangered;
- VU – Vulnerable;
- NT – Near threatened;
- LC – Least concern;
- DD – Data deficient;
- NE – Not evaluated.

== Microchiroptera (microbats) ==
=== Emballonuridae ===
==== Saccolaimus ====
- Yellow-bellied sheathtail bat, S. flaviventris. Endemic species with a wide distribution in mainland Australia. LC^{IUCN}
- Papuan sheath-tailed bat, S. mixtus. Cape York Peninsula and New Guinea. Also called the Cape-York sheath-tailed bat. NT^{IUCN}
- Bare-rumped sheath-tailed bat, S. saccolaimus. Northern Australia; South East Asia to India. Also called the naked-rumped sheathtail bat. LC^{IUCN}
  - S. s. nudicluniatus.
  - S. s. saccolaimus.

==== Taphozous ====
- Coastal sheath-tailed bat, T. australis. East coast of Queensland and the Torres Stait; recorded a few times in New Guinea. NT^{IUCN}
- Common sheath-tailed bat, T. georgianus. Endemic, north-western Australia. LC^{IUCN}
- Hill's sheath-tailed bat, T. hilli. Endemic, central inland Australia. LC^{IUCN}
- Arnhem sheath-tailed bat, T. kapalgensis. Endemic, Top End of the Northern Territory. LC^{IUCN}
- Troughton's sheath-tailed bat, T. troughtoni. Endemic, central and north-eastern Queensland. LC^{IUCN}

=== Miniopteridae ===
==== Miniopterus ====
- Little bent-wing bat, M. australis. East coast; New Guinea and Indonesia. LC^{IUCN}
- Northern bentwing bat, M. orianae. Northern and eastern Australia. Also called the Australasian bent-wing bat. NE
  - Southern bent-winged bat, M. o. bassanii. South-western Victoria.
  - Eastern bent-winged bat, M. o. oceanensis. Eastern Australia, along the entire coast.
  - Northern bent-winged bat, M. o. orianae. Top End of Northern Territory.

=== Molossidae ===
==== Austronomus ====
- White-striped freetail bat, A. australis. Endemic, entire mainland Australia. LC^{IUCN}

==== Chaerephon or Mops ====
- Great Northern free-tailed bat, C. jobensis. Northern Australia; Indonesia and New Guinea. Also called the northern mastiff bat or the Greater Northern free-tailed bat. LC^{IUCN}
  - C. j. colonicus.

==== Micronomus ====
- Eastern free-tailed bat, M. norfolkensis. East coast, from Brisbane to Bega. Also called the East-coast free-tailed bat or the Eastern little mastiff bat. NT^{IUCN}

==== Ozimops ====
- North-western free-tailed bat, O. cobourgianus. Endemic, northern coast and north-western coast. Also called the northern coastal free-tailed bat. LC^{IUCN}
- Cape York free-tailed bat, O. halli. Endemic, Cape York and the Northern Gulf. DD^{IUCN}
- South-western free-tailed bat, O. kitcheneri. Endemic, south-western Western Australia. LC^{IUCN}
- Northern free-tailed bat, O. lumsdenae. Endemic, widespread across the northern half of Australia. LC^{IUCN}
- Inland free-tailed bat, O. petersi. Endemic, widespread across the arid inland of Australia. LC^{IUCN}
- South-eastern free-tailed bat, O. planiceps. Endemic, south-eastern Australia, particularly the Western slopes of the Great Dividing Range. LC^{IUCN}
- Ride's free-tailed bat, O. ridei. Widespread across eastern Australian coasts. LC^{IUCN}

==== Setirostris ====
- Hairy-nosed freetail bat, S. eleryi. Endemic, eastern and central Australia. Also called the bristle-faced free-tailed bat. Treated as endangered under New South Wales law. NT^{IUCN}

=== Vespertilionidae (vesper bats) ===
==== Kerivoulinae ====
===== Phoniscus =====
- Golden-tipped bat, P. papuensis. Eastern and north-eastern coast; New Guinea. VU^{IUCN}

==== Murininae ====
===== Murina =====
- Flute-nosed bat, M. florium. Eastern Cape York; New Guinea and Indonesia. Also called the tube-nosed bat and the tube-nosed insectivorous bat. LC^{IUCN}
  - Flute-nosed bat, M. f. florium. Not known by the other names.

==== Nyctophilinae ====
===== Nyctophilus =====
- Arnhem long-eared bat, N. arnhemensis. Northern and north-western coasts. LC^{IUCN}
- Eastern long-eared bat, N. bifax. Northern, eastern and western coasts. LC^{IUCN}
- Corben's long-eared bat, N. corbeni. Endemic, eastern to south-eastern Australia. VU^{IUCN}
- Pallid long-eared bat, N. daedalus. Endemic, northern-most coast and the Northern Gulf. LC^{IUCN}
- Lesser long-eared bat, N. geoffroyi. Widespread across the entirety of Australia, including Tasmania. LC^{IUCN}
  - N. g. geoffroyi. Widespread across the entirety of Western Australia.
  - N. g. pacificus. Widespread across the entire eastern portion of Australia.
  - N. g. pallescens. Inland South Australia.
- Gould's long-eared bat, N. gouldi. Widespread across the eastern coasts of Australia, present in the south-western-most coasts. LC^{IUCN}
- Holts' long-eared bat, N. holtorum. Endemic, south-western-most coast. LC^{IUCN}
- Lord Howe long-eared bat, N. howensis. Previously endemic to Lord Howe Island. EX^{IUCN}
- Greater long-eared bat, N. major. Widespread across western, southern and inland-eastern Australia. Also called the central long-eared bat and the western long-eared bat. LC^{IUCN}
  - N. m. major. Endemic, south-western-most coast.
  - N. m. tor. Endemic, south-western to southern Australia, coastal and inland.
- Tasmanian long-eared bat, N. sherrini. Northern and eastern Tasmania. VU^{IUCN}
- Pygmy long-eared bat, N. walkeri. Northern coasts of Australia and the Northern Gulf. LC^{IUCN}
- Other uncertain species, Incertae sedis.

==== Vespertilioninae ====
===== Chalinolobus =====
- Large-eared pied bat, C. dwyeri. Inland eastern Australia. Also called the large pied bat. Treated as endangered under New South Wales law. VU^{IUCN}
- Gould's wattled bat, C. gouldii. Widespread across Australia, including the Kangaroo Island and Norfolk Island, excluding Cape York. LC^{IUCN}
- Chocolate wattled bat, C. morio. Widespread across southern Australia and the eastern coast; some presence in central Australia. LC^{IUCN}
- Hoary wattled bat, C. nigrogriseus. Northern and north-eastern coast; New Guinea. LC^{IUCN}
  - C. n. nigrogriseus. Northern and eastern Queensland.
  - C. n. rogersi. Northern and north-eastern coast.
- Little pied bat, C. picatus. Inland eastern Australia. NT^{IUCN}

===== Falsistrellus =====
- Western false pipistrelle, F. mackenziei. South-western-most coast. NT^{IUCN}
- Eastern false pipistrelle, F. tasmaniensis. Eastern to south-eastern coast of Australia, and northern and eastern coast of Tasmania. VU^{IUCN}

===== Myotis (mouse-eared bats) =====
- Large footed myotis, M. macropus. Eastern coasts from the south-eastern edge to Cape York and the south-eastern coast and inland; most of Victoria. LC^{IUCN}

===== Pipistrellus =====
- Forest pipistrelle, P. adamsi. Northern-most region of Australia. Also called the Cape York pipistrelle. LC^{IUCN}
- Christmas Island pipistrelle, P. murrayi. Previously endemic to a small, eastern section of Christmas Island. EX^{IUCN}
- Northern pipistrelle, P. westralis. Some northern coasts and the Northern Gulf. LC^{IUCN}

===== Scoteanax =====
- Greater broad-nosed bat, S. rueppellii. Eastern coast. LC^{IUCN}

===== Scotorepens =====
- Inland broad-nosed bat, S. balstoni. Widespread across the entirety of inland Australia. LC^{IUCN}
- Little broad-nosed bat, S. greyii. Widespread across the entirety of inland Australia except the southern-most portions. LC^{IUCN}
- Eastern broad-nosed bat, S. orion. Eastern coasts, particularly the south-eastern coasts, but can be found in the eastern coast of Cape York. Also called the south-eastern broad-nosed bat. LC^{IUCN}
- Northern broad-nosed bat, S. sanborni. Scattered across the northern coasts, more widespread in the northern to north-eastern coast of Queensland; New Guinea and Indonesia. LC^{IUCN}

===== Vespadelus =====
- Inland forest bat, V. baverstocki. Widespread across inland Australia. LC^{IUCN}
- Northern cave bat, V. caurinus. Northern coasts of Northern Territory and Western Australia. LC^{IUCN}
- Large forest bat, V. darlingtoni. Eastern to south-eastern coasts and the entirety of Tasmania. LC^{IUCN}
- Yellow-lipped bat, V. douglasorum. Northern-most coasts of Western Australia. LC^{IUCN}
- Finlayson's cave bat, V. finlaysoni. Widespread across the inland portion of Australia, as well as the northern-most coast and the western coasts. LC^{IUCN}
- Eastern forest bat, V. pumilus. Eastern-most coasts of Queensland and northern coasts of New South Wales. LC^{IUCN}
- Southern forest bat, V. regulus. Southern Australia, particularly around the coasts. LC^{IUCN}
- Eastern cave bat, V. troughtoni. Eastern Queensland and north-eastern New South Wales. LC^{IUCN}
- Little forest bat, V. vulturnus. Widespread across south-eastern Australia, including most of New South Wales and all of Victoria but excluding Tasmania. LC^{IUCN}

== Yinpterochiroptera ==
=== Hipposideridae ===
==== Hipposideros ====
- Dusky leaf-nosed bat, H. ater. Northern coasts. LC^{IUCN}
  - H. a. aruensis. Northern Queensland.
  - H. a. gilberti. Top End of Northern Territory and northern-most Western Australia.
- Fawn leaf-nosed bat, H. cervinus. North-eastern tip of Cape York Peninsula; Indonesia and New Guinea. LC^{IUCN}
  - H. c. cervinus.
- Diadem leaf-nosed bat, H. diadema. North-eastern tip of Cape York Peninsula; widespread across Indonesia; New Guinea, Cambodia, Malaysia, Vietnam, Thailand. LC^{IUCN}
  - H. d. reginae.
- Arnhem leaf-nosed bat, H. inornatus. Northern-most tip of Northern Australia. VU^{IUCN}
- Semon's leaf-nosed bat, H. semoni. North-eastern tip of Cape York and Queensland. LC^{IUCN}
- Northern leaf-nosed bat, H. stenotis. Northern coasts of Australia. VU^{IUCN}

=== Megadermatidae (false vampires) ===
==== Macroderma ====
- Ghost bat, M. gigas. Across the northern coasts of Australia. VU^{IUCN}

=== Rhinolophidae ===
==== Rhinolophus ====
- Eastern horseshoe bat, R. megaphyllus. Entire eastern coast of Australia and the southern coast of Victoria. LC^{IUCN}
  - R. m. ignifer. Cape York Peninsula.
  - R. m. megaphyllus. East coasts of New South Wales and Victoria.
- R. robertsi. Endemic. Cape York Peninsula.
- Large-eared horseshoe bat, Rhinolophus philippinensis - northeast Queensland. LC^{IUCN}

=== Rhinonycteridae ===
==== Rhinonicteris ====
- Orange leaf-nosed bat R. aurantia. North-most coasts excluding Cape York. LC^{IUCN}

=== Pteropodidae ===
==== Harpyionycterinae ====
===== Dobsonia =====
- Bare-backed fruit bat, D. magna. North-eastern Cape York Peninsula; Melanesia. LC^{IUCN}

==== Macroglossusinae ====
===== Macroglossus =====
- Northern blossom-bat, M. minimus. Northern Australia. Also called the dagger-toothed long-nosed fruit bat. LC^{IUCN}
  - M. m. pygmaeus.

===== Syconycteris =====
- Common blossom bat, S. australis. Eastern and north-eastern coasts. Also called the eastern blossom bat. LC^{IUCN}
  - S. a. australis.

==== Nyctimeninae ====
===== Nyctimene =====
- Eastern tube-nosed bat, N. robinsini. Possibly endemic. Eastern to north-eastern coast. LC^{IUCN}

==== Pteropodinae ====
===== Pteropus =====
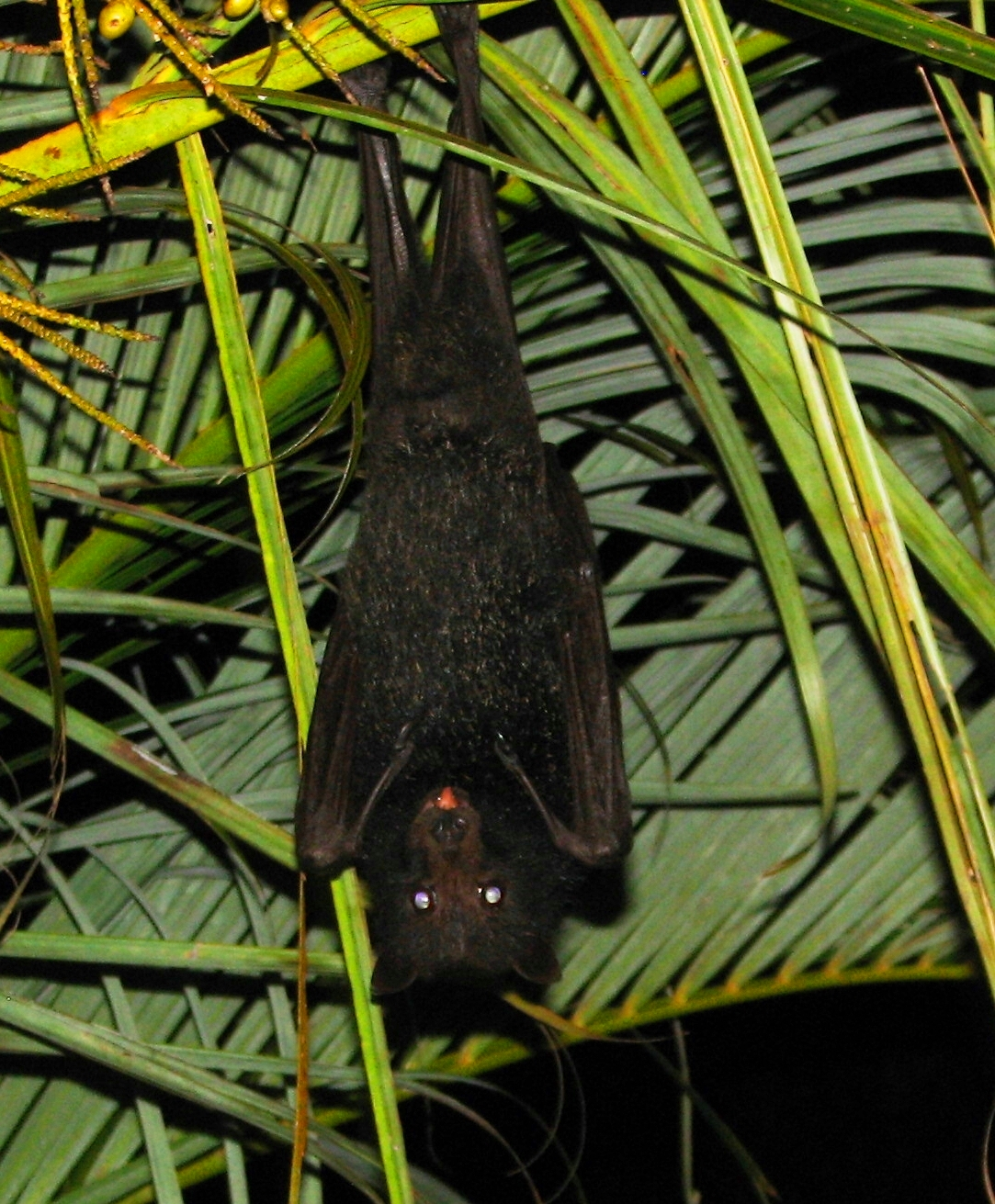
Black flying fox

- Black flying fox, P. alecto. Widespread across Western Australia and the northern, north-eastern and eastern coasts. LC^{IUCN}
  - P. a. gouldii. The coastal regions of the above.
- Percy Island flying fox, P. brunneus. Previously in a north-eastern part of Queensland. EX^{IUCN}
- Spectacled flying fox, P. conspicillatus. Eastern coast of Queensland. EN^{IUCN}
  - P. c. conspicillatus. North-eastern tip of Cape York Peninsula.
- Large-eared flying-fox, P. macrotis. Presence in Australia is controversial. May be located in the Torres Strait Islands. LC^{IUCN}
  - P. m. epularius.
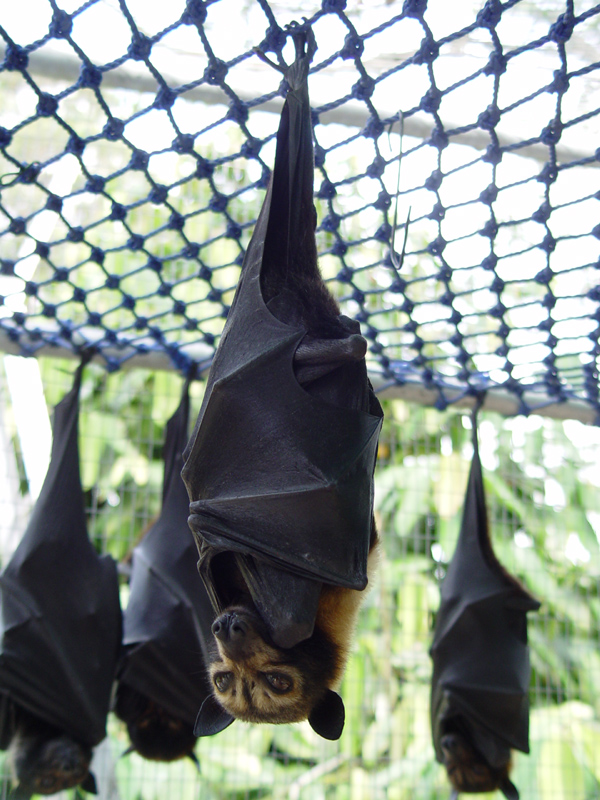
    Spectacled flying-fox (Pteropus conspicillatus)
- Christmas Island flying fox, P. natalis. Endemic to Christmas Island. Due to controversial taxonomic status, IUCN has not yet recognised this animal as a separate species. If it were recognised as an individual species by IUCN, its status would be CE^{IUCN}
- Grey-headed flying fox, P. poliocephalus. Eastern and south-eastern coast. VU^{IUCN}
- Little red flying fox, P. scapulatus. Widespread throughout the northern portion of Australia. LC^{IUCN}

== See also ==
- Australasian Bat Society
- Fauna of Australia
