= List of mammals of Queensland =

This is a list of mammals native to Queensland in Australia.

The following tags are used to highlight each species' conservation status as assessed by the International Union for Conservation of Nature:

EX	Extinct	No reasonable doubt that the last individual has died.
EW	Extinct in the wild	Known only to survive in captivity or as a naturalized populations well outside its previous range.
CR	Critically endangered	The species is in imminent risk of extinction in the wild.
EN	Endangered	The species is facing an extremely high risk of extinction in the wild.
VU	Vulnerable	The species is facing a high risk of extinction in the wild.
NT	Near threatened	The species does not meet any of the criteria that would categorise it as risking extinction but it is likely to do so in the future.
LC	Least concern	There are no current identifiable risks to the species.
DD	Data deficient	There is inadequate information to make an assessment of the risks to this species.

== Subclass: Prototheria ==
=== Order: Monotremata ===
- Family: Tachyglossidae
  - Genus: Tachyglossus
    - Short-beaked echidna, T. aculeatus LC
- Family: Ornithorhynchidae
  - Genus: Ornithorhynchus
    - Platypus, O. anatidae NT

== Clade: Metatheria ==
=== Infraclass: Marsupialia ===
- Grandorder: Agreodontia
  - Order: Dasyuromorphia
    - Family: Dasyuridae
      - Subfamily: Dasyurinae
        - Tribe: Dasyurini
          - Genus: Dasycercus
            - Species: Brush-tailed mulgara D. blythi LC
          - Genus: Dasyuroides
            - Species: Kowari D. byrnei VU
          - Genus: Dasyurus: Quolls
            - Species: Northern quoll D. hallucatus EN
            - Species: Tiger quoll D. maculatus VU
          - Genus: Pseudantechinus
            - Species: Alexandria false antechinus P. mimulus NT
        - Tribe: Phascogalini
          - Genus: Antechinus
            - Species: Tropical antechinus A. adustus LC Endemic
            - Species: Silver-headed antechinus A. argentis EN Endemic
            - Species: Yellow-footed antechinus A. flavipes LC
            - Species: Atherton antechinus A. godmani LC Endemic
            - Species: Cinnamon antechinus A. leo LC Endemic
            - Species: Buff-footed antechinus A. mysticus NE
            - Species: Brown antechinus A. stuartii LC
            - Species: Subtropical antechinus A. subtropicus LC
            - Species: Dusky antechinus A. swainsonii LC
          - Genus: Phascogale
            - Species: Brush-tailed phascogale P. tapoatafa NT
      - Subfamily: Sminthopsinae
        - Tribe: Planigalini
          - Genus: Planigale
            - Species: Paucident planigale P. gilesi LC
            - Species: Long-tailed planigale P. ingrami LC
            - Species: Common planigale P. maculata LC
            - Species: Narrow-nosed planigale P. tenuirostris LC
        - Tribe: Sminthopsini
          - Genus: Antechinomys
            - Species: Kultarr A. laniger LC
          - Genus: Ningaui
            - Species: Wongai ningaui N. ridei LC
          - Genus: Sminthopsis: Dunnart
            - Species: Chestnut dunnart S. archeri DD
            - Species: Fat-tailed dunnart S. crassicaudata LC
            - Species: Julia Creek dunnart S. douglasi NT Endemic
            - Species: Hairy-footed dunnart S. hirtipes LC
            - Species: White-footed dunnart S. leucopus LC
            - Species: Stripe-faced dunnart S. macroura LC
            - Species: Slender-tailed dunnart S. murina LC
            - Species: Red-cheeked dunnart S. virginiae NT
            - Species: Lesser hairy-footed dunnart S. youngsoni LC
  - Order: Peramelemorphia
    - Family: Peramelidae
      - Subfamily:: Echymiperinae
        - Genus: Echymipera
          - Species: Long-nosed spiny bandicoot E. rufescens LC
      - Subfamily:: Peramelinae
        - Genus: Isoodon
          - Species: Northern brown bandicoot I. macrourus LC
          - Species: Southern brown bandicoot I. obesulus EN
          - Species: Cape York brown bandicoot I. peninsulae NE
        - Genus: Perameles
          - Species: Long-nosed bandicoot P. nasuta LC
          - Species: Northern long-nosed bandicoot P. pallescens NE
    - Family: Thylacomyidae
      - Genus: Macrotis
        - Species: Greater bilby M. lagotis VU
- Order: Diprotodontia
  - Suborder: Macropodiformes
    - Family: Hypsiprymnodontidae
      - Genus: Hypsiprymnodon
        - Species: Musky rat-kangaroo H. moschatus LC Endemic
    - Family: Macropodidae
      - Subfamily: Macropodinae
        - Genus: Dendrolagus
          - Species: Bennett's tree-kangaroo D. bennettianus NT Endemic
          - Species: Lumholtz's tree-kangaroo D. lumholtzi NT Endemic
        - Genus: Lagorchestes
          - Species: Spectacled hare-wallaby L. conspicillatus LC
        - Genus: Macropus
          - Species: Western grey kangaroo M. fuliginosus LC
          - Species: Eastern grey kangaroo M. giganteus LC
        - Genus: Notamacropus
          - Species: Agile wallaby N. agilis LC
          - Species: Black-striped wallaby N. dorsalis LC
          - Species: Whiptail wallaby N. parryi LC
          - Species: Red-necked wallaby N. rufogriseus LC
        - Genus: Onychogalea
          - Species: Bridled nail-tail wallaby O. fraenata VU
          - Species: Northern nail-tail wallaby O. unguifera LC
        - Genus: Osphranter
          - Species: Antilopine kangaroo O. antilopinus LC
          - Species: Common wallaroo O. robustus LC
          - Species: Red kangaroo O. rufus LC
        - Genus: Petrogale
          - Species: Allied rock-wallaby P. assimilis LC Endemic
          - Species: Cape York rock-wallaby P. coenensis EN Endemic
          - Species: Godman's rock-wallaby P. godmani NT Endemic
          - Species: Herbert's rock-wallaby P. herberti LC Endemic
          - Species: Unadorned rock-wallaby P. inornata LC Endemic
          - Species: Mareeba rock-wallaby P. mareeba NT Endemic
          - Species: Brush-tailed rock-wallaby P. penicillata VU
          - Species: Proserpine rock-wallaby P. persephone EN Endemic
          - Species: Purple-necked rock-wallaby P. purpureicollis NT
          - Species: Mount Claro rock-wallaby P. sharmani VU Endemic
          - Species: Yellow-footed rock-wallaby P. xanthopus NT
        - Genus: Thylogale
          - Species: Red-legged pademelon T. stigmatica LC
          - Species: Red-necked pademelon T. thetis LC
        - Genus: Wallabia
          - Species: Swamp wallaby W. bicolor LC
    - Family: Potoroidae
      - Genus: Aepyprymnus
        - Species: Rufous rat-kangaroo A. rufescens LC
      - Genus: Bettongia
        - Species: Northern bettong B. tropica EN Endemic
      - Genus: Potorous
        - Species: Long-nosed potoroo P. tridactylus NT
  - Suborder: Phalangeriformes
    - Superfamily: Phalangeroidea
      - Family: Burramyidae
        - Genus: Cercartetus
          - Species: Long-tailed pygmy possum C. caudatus LC
          - Species: Eastern pygmy possum C. nanus LC
      - Family: Phalangeridae
        - Genus: Phalanger
          - Species: Southern common cuscus P. mimicus LC
        - Genus: Spilocuscus
          - Species: Common spotted cuscus S. maculatus LC
        - Genus: Trichosurus
          - Species: Short-eared possum T. caninus LC
          - Species: Common brushtail possum T. vulpecula LC
    - Superfamily: Petauroidea
      - Family: Acrobatidae
        - Genus: Acrobates
          - Species: Feathertail glider A. pygmaeus LC
      - Family: Petauridae
        - Genus: Dactylopsila
          - Species: Striped possum D. trivirgata LC
        - Genus: Petaurus
          - Species: Savanna glider P. ariel NE
          - Species: Yellow-bellied glider P. australis VU
          - Species: Sugar glider P. breviceps LC
          - Species: Mahogany glider P. gracilis EN Endemic
          - Species: Squirrel glider P. norfolcensis LC
          - Species: Krefft's glider P. notatus NE
      - Family: Pseudocheiridae
        - Genus: Hemibelideus
          - Species: Lemuroid ringtail possum H. lemuroides NT Endemic
        - Genus: Petauroides
          - Species: Northern greater glider P. minor VU Endemic
          - Species: Southern greater glider P. volans EN
        - Genus: Petropseudes
          - Species: Rock-haunting ringtail possum P. dahli LC
        - Genus: Pseudocheirus
          - Species: Common ringtail possum P. peregrinus LC
        - Genus: Pseudochirops
          - Species: Green ringtail possum P. archeri NT Endemic
        - Genus: Pseudochirulus
          - Species: Daintree River ringtail possum P. cinereus NT Endemic
          - Species: Herbert River ringtail possum P. herbertensis LC Endemic
  - Suborder: Vombatiformes
    - Family: Phascolarctidae
      - Genus: Phascolarctos
        - Species: Koala P. cinereus VU
    - Family: Vombatidae
      - Genus: Lasiorhinus
        - Species: Northern hairy-nosed wombat L. krefftii CR Endemic
      - Genus: Vombatus
        - Species: Common wombat V. ursinus LC

== Clade: Eutheria ==
=== Infraclass: Placentalia ===
- Superorder: Afrotheria
  - Order: Sirenia
    - Genus: Dugong
      - Species: Dugong D. dugon VU
- Order: Artiodactyla
  - Infraorder: Cetacea
    - Family: Balaenidae
      - Genus: Eubalaena
        - Species: Southern right whale E. australis LC
    - Family: Balaenopteridae
      - Genus: Balaenoptera
        - Species: Dwarf minke whale B. acutorostrata LC
        - Species: Antarctic minke whale A. bonaerensis NT
        - Species: Sei whale B. borealis EN
        - Species: Bryde's whale B. edeni LC
        - Species: Omura's whale B. omurai DD
        - Species: Blue whale B. musculus EN
        - Species: Fin whale B. physalis VU
      - Genus: Megaptera
        - Species: Humpback whale M. novaeangliae LC
    - Family: Delphinidae
      - Genus: Delphinus
        - Species: Short-beaked common dolphin, D. delphis LC
      - Genus: Feresa
        - Species: Pygmy killer whale, F. attenuata LC
      - Genus: Globicephala
        - Species: Short-finned pilot whale, G. macrorhynchus LC
        - Species: Long-finned pilot whale, G. melas LC
      - Genus: Grampus
        - Species: Risso's dolphin, G. griseus LC
      - Genus: Lagenodelphis
        - Species: Fraser's dolphin, L. hosei LC
      - Genus: Lagenorhynchus
        - Species: Dusky dolphin, L. obscurus LC
      - Genus: Orcaella
        - Species: Australian snubfin dolphin, O. heinsohni VU
      - Genus: Orcinus
        - Species: Orca, O. orca DD
      - Genus: Peponocephala
        - Species: Melon-headed whale, P. electra LC
      - Genus: Pseudorca
        - Species: False killer whale, P. crassidens NT
      - Genus: Sousa
        - Species: Australian humpback dolphin, S. sahulensis VU
      - Genus: Stenella
        - Species: Pantropical spotted dolphin, S. attenuata LC
        - Species: Striped dolphin, S. coeruleoalba LC
        - Species: Spinner dolphin, S. longirostris LC
      - Genus: Steno
        - Species: Rough-toothed dolphin, S. bredanensis LC
      - Genus: Tursiops
        - Species: Indo-Pacific bottlenose dolphin, T. aduncus NT
        - Species: Bottlenose dolphin, T. truncatus LC
    - Family: Kogiidae
      - Genus: Kogia
        - Species: Pygmy sperm whale, K. breviceps LC
        - Species: Dwarf sperm whale, K. simus LC
    - Family: Physeteridae
      - Genus: Physeter
        - Species: Sperm whale, P. macrocephalus VU
    - Family: Ziphiidae
      - Genus: Indopacetus
        - Species: Longman's beaked whale, I. pacificus LC
      - Genus: Mesoplodon
        - Species: Blainville's beaked whale, M. densirostris LC
        - Species: Ginkgo-toothed beaked whale, M. ginkgodens DD
        - Species: Strap-toothed whale, M. layardii LC
      - Genus: Ziphius
        - Species: Cuvier's beaked whale, Z. cavirostris LC
- Order: Carnivora
  - Family: Canidae
    - Genus: Canis
      - Species: Dingo C. familiaris NE
- Order: Chiroptera
  - Suborder: Microchiroptera
    - Family: Emballonuridae
      - Genus: Saccolaimus
        - Species: Yellow-bellied sheath-tailed bat S. flaviventrus LC
        - Species: Cape York sheath-tailed bat S. mixtus NT
        - Species: Naked-rumped pouched bat S. saccolaimus LC
      - Genus: Taphozous
        - Species: Coastal sheath-tailed bat T. australis NT
        - Species: Common sheath-tailed bat T. georgianus LC
        - Species: Hill's sheath-tailed bat T. hilli LC
        - Species: Troughton's sheath-tailed bat T. troughtoni LC
    - Family: Miniopteridae
      - Genus: Miniopterus
        - Species: Little bent-wing bat M. australis LC
        - Species: Australasian bent-wing bat M. orianae NE
    - Family: Molossidae
      - Genus: Austronomus
        - Species: White-striped free-tailed bat A. australis LC
      - Genus: Mops
        - Species: Northern freetail bat M. jobensis LC
      - Genus: Micronomus
        - Species: Eastern freetail bat M. norfolkensis NT
      - Genus: Ozimops
        - Species: North-western free-tailed bat O. cobourgianus LC
        - Species: Cape York free-tailed bat O. halli DD Endemic
        - Species: Northern free-tailed bat O. lumsdenae LC
        - Species: Inland free-tailed bat O. petersi LC
        - Species: Ride's free-tailed bat O. ridei LC
      - Genus: Setirostris
        - Species: Bristle-faced freetail bat S. eleryi NT
    - Family: Vespertilionidae
      - Genus: Chalinolobus
        - Species: Large-eared pied bat C. dwyeri VU
        - Species: Gould's wattled bat C. gouldii LC
        - Species: Chocolate wattled bat C. morio LC
        - Species: Hoary wattled bat C. nigrogriseus LC
        - Species: Little pied bat C. picatus NT
      - Genus: Falsistrellus
        - Species: Eastern false pipistrelle F. tasmaniensis VU
      - Genus: Murina
        - Species: Flute-nosed bat M. florium LC
      - Genus: Myotis
        - Species: Large-footed myotis M. macropus LC
      - Genus: Nyctophilus
        - Species: Arnhem long-eared bat N. arnhemensis LC
        - Species: Eastern long-eared bat N. bifax LC
        - Species: Corben's long-eared bat N. corbeni VU
        - Species: Pallid long-eared bat N. daedalus LC
        - Species: Gould's long-eared bat N. gouldi LC
        - Species: Pygmy long-eared bat N. walkeri LC
      - Genus: Phoniscus
        - Species: Golden-tipped bat P. papuensis VU
      - Genus: Pipistrellus
        - Species: Forest pipistrelle P. adamsi LC
        - Species: Northern pipistrelle P. westralis LC
      - Genus: Scoteanax
        - Species: Greater broad-nosed bat S. rueppellii LC
      - Genus: Scotorepens
        - Species: Inland broad-nosed bat S. balstoni LC
        - Species: Little broad-nosed bat S. greyii LC
        - Species: Eastern broad-nosed bat S. orion LC
        - Species: Northern broad-nosed bat S. sanborni LC
      - Genus: Vespadelus
        - Species: Inland broad-nosed bat S. balstoni LC
        - Species: Northern cave bat V. caurinus LC
        - Species: Large forest bat V. darlingtoni LC
        - Species: Finlayson's cave bat V. finlaysoni LC
        - Species: Eastern forest bat V. pumilus LC
        - Species: Southern forest bat V. regulus LC
        - Species: Eastern cave bat V. troughtoni LC
        - Species: Little forest bat V. vulturnus LC
  - Suborder: Yinpterochiroptera
    - Family: Hipposideridae
      - Genus: Hipposideros
        - Species: Dusky leaf-nosed bat H. ater LC
        - Species: Fawn leaf-nosed bat H. cervinus LC
        - Species: Diadem leaf-nosed bat H. diadema LC
        - Species: Semon's leaf-nosed bat H. semoni LC
        - Species: Northern leaf-nosed bat H. stenotis VU
    - Family: Megadermatidae
      - Genus: Macroderma
        - Species: Ghost bat M. gigas VU
    - Family: Rhinolophidae
      - Genus: Rhinolophus
        - Species: Smaller horseshoe bat R. megaphyllus LC
        - Species: Large-eared horseshoe bat R. philippinensis LC
    - Family: Rhinonycteridae
      - Genus: Rhinonicteris
        - Species: Orange leaf-nosed bat R. aurantia LC
    - Family: Pteropodidae
      - Genus: Dobsonia
        - Species: Bare-backed fruit bat D. magna LC
      - Genus: Macroglossus
        - Species: Northern blossom bat M. minimus LC
      - Genus: Nyctimene
        - Species: Eastern tube-nosed bat N. robinsoni LC
      - Genus: Pteropus
        - Species: Black flying fox P. alecto LC
        - Species: Spectacled flying fox P. conspicillatus EN
        - Species: Grey-headed flying fox P. poliocephalus VU
        - Species: Little red flying fox P. scapulatus LC
      - Genus: Syconycteris
        - Species: Common blossom bat S. australis LC
- Order: Rodentia
  - Family: Muridae
    - Genus: Conilurus
      - Species: Brush-tailed rabbit rat C. penicillatus VU
    - Genus: Hydromys
      - Species: Rakali H. chrysogaster LC
    - Genus: Leggadina
      - Species: Forrest's mouse L. forresti LC
      - Species: Lakeland Downs mouse L. lakedownensis LC Endemic
    - Genus: Melomys
      - Species: Grassland mosaic-tailed rat M. burtoni LC
      - Species: Cape York mosaic-tailed rat M. capensis LC Endemic
      - Species: Fawn-footed mosaic-tailed rat M. cervinipes LC
    - Genus: Mesembriomys
      - Species: Black-footed tree-rat M. gouldii VU
    - Genus: Notomys
      - Species: Spinifex hopping mouse N. alexis LC
      - Species: Fawn hopping mouse N. cervinus NT
      - Species: Dusky hopping mouse N. fuscus NT
    - Genus: Pogonomys
      - Species: Prehensile-tailed rat P. mollipilosus NE
    - Genus: Pseudomys
      - Species: Plains rat P. australis VU
      - Species: Little native mouse P. delicatulus LC
      - Species: Desert mouse P. desertor VU
      - Species: Eastern chestnut mouse P. gracilicaudatus LC
      - Species: Sandy inland mouse P. hermannsburgensis LC
      - Species: Central pebble-mound mouse P. johnsoni LC
      - Species: Western chestnut mouse P. nanus LC
      - Species: New Holland mouse P. novaehollandiae VU
      - Species: Hastings River mouse P. oralis VU
      - Species: Eastern pebble mound mouse P. patrius LC Endemic
    - Genus: Rattus
      - Species: Bush rat R. fuscipes LC
      - Species: Cape York rat P. leucopus LC
      - Species: Australian swamp rat R. lutreolus LC
      - Species: Dusky field rat R. sordidus LC
      - Species: Pale field rat R. tunneyi LC
      - Species: Long-haired rat R. villosissimus LC
    - Genus: Uromys
      - Species: Giant white-tailed rat U. caudimaculatus LC
      - Species: Masked white-tailed rat U. hadrourus NT Endemic
    - Genus: Xeromys
      - Species: Water mouse X. myoides VU
    - Genus: Zyzomys
      - Species: Common rock rat Z. argurus VU
