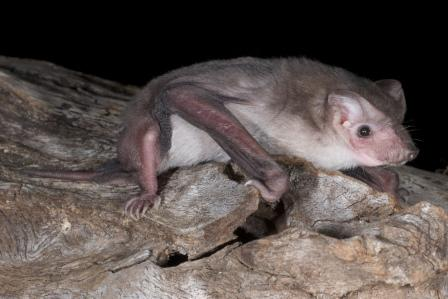
- Mormopterus beccarii

Scientific classification
- Kingdom: Animalia
- Phylum: Chordata
- Class: Mammalia
- Order: Chiroptera
- Family: Molossidae
- Genus: Mormopterus; Peters, 1865

Type species
- Mormopterus jugularis Peters, 1865

= Mormopterus =

Genus of bats

Mormopterus is a genus of molossid microchiropterans, small flying mammals referred to as free-tailed bats. The genus has been the subject of several revisions, and the diversity of taxa centred on Australia were separated to a new genus Ozimops, and two monotypic genera, Setirostris and Micronomus. The species of Mormopterus, in this stricter sense, are only found in areas outside of Australia and West Papua.

== Taxonomy ==
A description of the genus was published in 1865 by Wilhelm Peters, as a new subgenus allied to Nyctinomus.

While the species-level taxonomy became better resolved, the integrity of the genus Mormopterus as it stood was less clear and molecular sequencing data indicated that Mormopterus was paraphyletic. The closest relatives of M. kalinowski are members of Nyctinomops. Further phylogenetic work is required to resolve the relationships of the species’ groups from the three regional areas, and what their relationships are to other molossid genera.

Investigations of Australian bat systematics have resulted in species confusion, which has in turn inhibited other research and recognition for the purpose of conservation; Mormopterus had presented the greatest difficulties to taxonomic workers. A revision in 2014 used a multilocus approach, combining morphological and molecular analysis to further separate the genus; this recognised the subgenus Micronomus and erected two new taxa, subgenera Setirostris (monotypic) and Ozimops, which circumscribed four accepted and three new species of Mormopterus. Prior to this revision some taxa were given tentative labels of convenience by workers, Mormopterus sp. 1, 2, 3 ... , following a molecular study in 1998 that identified probable species without publishing descriptions.

The Australian Faunal Directory, citing a 2015 taxonomic publication that elevated subgenera published in a 2014 review, recognises genera Ozimops, Setirostris and Micronomus and the new generic combinations of taxa formerly assigned to this genus.

== Diversity ==
The genus Mormopterus has seven species occurring in geographically disparate locations, three species from the west Indian Ocean region (Madagascar and the Mascarene Islands and possibly South Africa and Ethiopia), one species from western Indonesia (known from a single specimen from Sumatra) that appears to be related to the above three species; and three species from the neotropics (the western side of South America as far south as northern Chile, and Cuba). The former subgenus Ozimops, later elevated to genus, is most diverse in Australia, although also found in the Indonesian Archipelago, Halmahera, Ambon, Seram and West Papua, and in Papua New Guinea. The two monotypic subgenera Micronomus and Setirostris, also elevated to genus, are endemic to Australia.

=== Species ===
The intergeneric arrangement, prior to 2014 elevation of the four subgenera, may be summarised as:

- Subgenus Mormopterus
  - Mormopterus acetabulosus Natal free-tailed bat
  - Mormopterus francoismoutoui, Reunion free-tailed bat
  - Mormopterus doriae Sumatran mastiff bat
  - Mormopterus jugularis Peters's wrinkle-lipped bat
  - Mormopterus kalinowskii Kalinowski's mastiff bat
  - Mormopterus minutus little goblin bat
  - Mormopterus phrudus Incan little mastiff bat

=== Synonyms ===
Synonyms of mainly Australian species, later recognised as new genera.

- Subgenus Micronomus
  - Mormopterus norfolkensis East-coast free-tailed bat
- Subgenus Setirostris
  - Mormopterus eleryi bristle-faced free-tailed bat
- Subgenus Ozimops
  - Mormopterus planiceps, southern free-tailed bat
  - Mormopterus beccarii, Beccari's mastiff bat
  - Mormopterus loriae, Loria's mastiff bat, little Papuan mastiff bat
  - Mormopterus petersi, inland free-tailed bat
  - Mormopterus kitcheneri, south-western free-tailed bat
  - Mormopterus ridei, eastern free-tailed bat
  - Mormopterus lumsdenae, northern free-tailed bat
  - Mormopterus halli, Cape York free-tailed bat
  - Mormopterus cobourgianus, mangrove free-tailed bat

In addition, Peters's flat-headed bat (Platymops setiger) and Roberts's flat-headed bat (Sauromys petrophilus) were once thought to belong to this genus.
