= Wilhelm Leche =

Swedish zoologist (1850–1927)

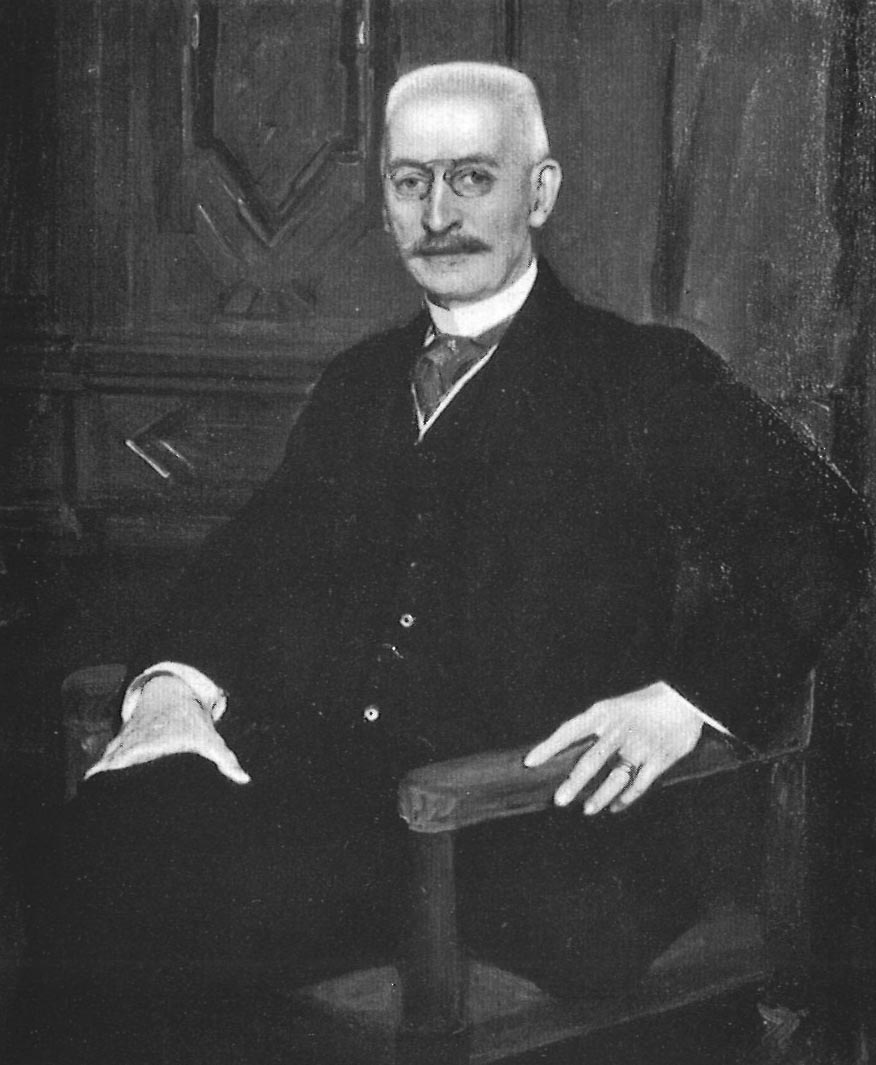
Leche, Wilhelm by Oscar Björck 1910

Wilhelm Leche (1850–1927) was a Swedish zoologist who published works on mammals.

Jakob Wilhelm Ebbe Gustaf Leche was born in Helsingborgs Maria parish on 4 September 1850. He lived until 29 January 1927, and was interred at the Adolf Fredrik Church in Stockholm.

He was Rector of Stockholm University College from 1887 to 1890.

Leche was an early advocate of the evolutionary theories of Charles Darwin, writing a book on the human species that incorporated the contemporary evolutionary theory. Leche was nevertheless cautious in regard to natural selection, due to its adoption by social darwinist political thought and movements that opposed his own radical opposition to social inequality.

Amongst Leche's works is a description for a small Australian bat, currently known as Ozimops petersi.
