= Mormopterus francoismoutoui =

Conservation status
- Least Concern (IUCN 3.1)

Scientific classification
- Kingdom: Animalia
- Phylum: Chordata
- Class: Mammalia
- Order: Chiroptera
- Family: Molossidae
- Genus: Mormopterus
- Species: M. francoismoutoui

Binomial name
- Mormopterus francoismoutoui Goodman, Jansen van Vuuren, Ratrimomanarivo, Probst & Bowie, 2008
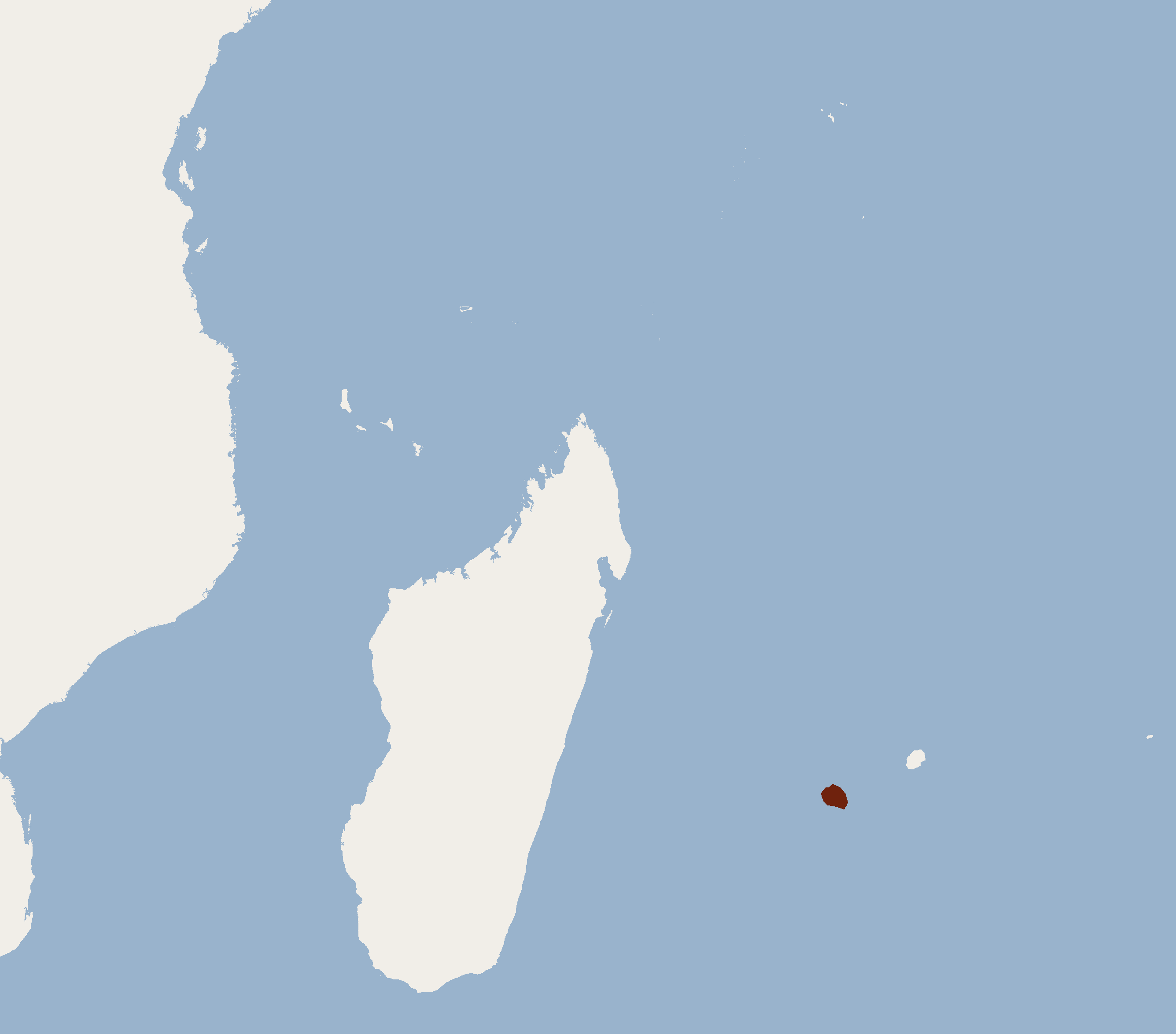

Species of bat

Mormopterus francoismoutoui is a species of free-tailed bat that is endemic to the island of Réunion, which is east of Madagascar.

== Taxonomy ==
M. francoismoutoui was described as a new species in 2008. The holotype had been collected in 2006 in the commune of La Possession on the island of Réunion. The eponym for the species name "francoismoutoui " is biologist François Moutou.

== Description ==
M. francoismoutoui is a relatively large member of its genus, with a forearm length ranging from 38–42 mm (1.5–1.7 in). Adult body mass ranges from 6.0–8.2 g (0.21–0.29 oz). It has a dental formula of 1.1.1.33.1.2.3 for a total of 30 teeth.

== Range and habitat ==
M. francoismoutoui is found only on the island of Réunion. It has been recorded throughout the island at various localities ranging from 0–2,000 m (0–6,562 ft) above sea level.

== Conservation ==
As of 2017, M. francoismoutoui is evaluated as a least-concern species by the IUCN—its lowest conservation priority. It meets the criteria for this classification because it has numerous large roosts across the island. Additionally, no threats to the species are known.
