= Lindy Lumsden =

Australian zoologist

Lindy Lumsden PSM (born 1955) is a principal research scientist with the Department of Environment, Land, Water and Planning, at the Arthur Rylah Institute for Environmental Research, in Melbourne, Australia.

== Early life and education ==
Born in Foster, Victoria, in 1955, Lindy completed a Bachelor of Science, with a major in Zoology, at the University of Melbourne in 1975. She received her PhD from Deakin University in 2004, with her thesis on 'The ecology and conservation of insectivorous bats in rural landscapes'.

== Career ==
Lumsden began her career in 1979, working as a technical officer surveying the vertebrate fauna of the Western Port catchment, with the Museum of Victoria. She has worked at the Arthur Rylah Institute (ARI) since 1982. Her first roles were with the Wildlife Survey Team, conducting mammal surveys throughout Victoria to inform land-use planning decisions by the Land Conservation Council, including the Melbourne-2 area. From 1991-1994, Lumsden undertook a major project on the conservation of insectivorous bats in remnant vegetation in rural environments in northern Victoria. From 1995 to 2000, she was part of an extensive collaborative project in the Box-Ironbark region of Victoria investigating extinction processes affecting vertebrate fauna. At this time Lindy also undertook consultancies on bats within Victoria and throughout Australia, including on Christmas Island. As part of this, Lumsden prepared the Christmas Island Pipistrelle Recovery Plan.

From 2004 to 2008, Lumsden was program leader of the Threatened Fauna Species Program at ARI, managing several staff and targeted research projects, working on many collaborative projects. Since November 2008, Lumsden has been the principal research scientist and Section Leader of the Wildlife Ecology Section at ARI, managing a team of scientists and technical staff, and responsible for many projects. She led the key government priority project 'A New Strategic Approach to Biodiversity Management', developing an effective landscape approach to the management of threatened species that provides opportunities for sustainable timber production while managing biodiversity at a landscape scale. This work resulted in innovative developments in survey methods for cryptic forest fauna.

Lumsden's research projects have included investigating the conservation requirements of bats in agricultural landscapes in Victoria. Overall, Lumsden has published 34 journal articles, 39 book sections; 27 popular articles and notes; and more than 28 unpublished reports.

Lumsden is passionate about changing people's attitudes to bats, which are a poorly understood group of native fauna. She delivers large numbers of presentations to community groups and university students, and runs courses and field days on the conservation of bats (over the last 20 years she has averaged 25 presentations per year). She has undertaken many radio interviews on ABC radio throughout Australia and internationally (Radio Australia) and her work has been reported in Melbourne and rural newspapers.

== Awards ==
- 2014 The Northern free-tailed bat—Ozimops lumsdenae—was named after Lumsden. The naming recognises Lindy's contribution to the study of Australian bat ecology, for her mentoring of students and her advocacy for conservation of bats through public engagement. The description of this species follows recognition that the Australian populations of this bat are distinct from those in south-east Asia.
- 2019 Public Service Medal (PSM) “For outstanding public service to the conservation of native wildlife in Victoria.”
