= Ozimops loriae =

Loria's mastiff bat

Conservation status
- Data Deficient (IUCN 3.1)

Scientific classification
- Kingdom: Animalia
- Phylum: Chordata
- Class: Mammalia
- Order: Chiroptera
- Family: Molossidae
- Genus: Ozimops
- Species: O. loriae

Binomial name
- Ozimops loriae Thomas, 1897

Synonyms
- Mormopterus loriae

Species of bat

Ozimops loriae is a species of bat found in Australia and Papua New Guinea.

The common names include Loria's mastiff bat and little northern free-tailed bat. The species was formerly described as Mormopterus loriae, and assigned to an Australian centred taxon Ozimops in 2014.
