= Golden-tipped bat =

Conservation status
- Vulnerable (IUCN 3.1)

Scientific classification
- Kingdom: Animalia
- Phylum: Chordata
- Class: Mammalia
- Order: Chiroptera
- Family: Vespertilionidae
- Genus: Phoniscus
- Species: P. papuensis

Binomial name
- Phoniscus papuensis (Dobson, 1878)
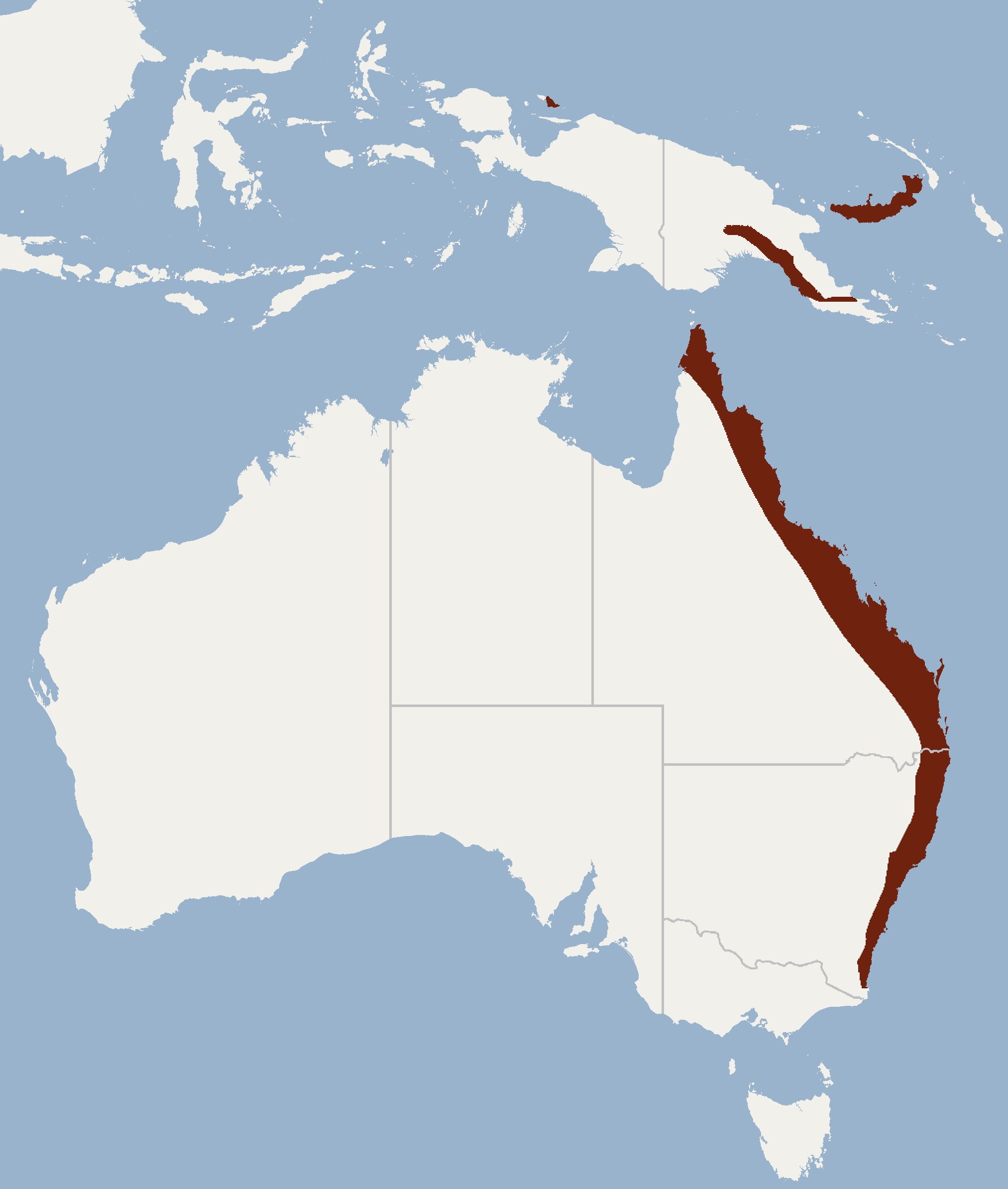

Synonyms
- Kerivoula papuensis Dobson, 1878

Species of bat

The golden-tipped bat (Phoniscus papuensis) is a species of Microchiropteran in the family Vespertilionidae. It is found in Papua New Guinea and in Australia, especially scattered along the eastern part of Australia. The species is considered uncommon, and is listed as endangered in Australia.

== Description ==
The golden-tipped bat has brown color and broken color patterns on its pelage; the body is covered with woolly fur. Broken color patterns support crypsis in the golden-tipped bat; thick pelage and wooly fur provide thermal insulation. The average weight of adults is 6.7 g (0.24 oz).

The wings of the golden-tipped bat show a low aspect ratio, with low wing loading. (That is, the wing is broad.) These wing features of support slow flight. Additionally, the large tail membrane aids the wing membrane in enabling tight turns in flight. Rounded wing tips also contribute to high maneuverability in flight.

The golden-tipped bat also uses echolocation for foraging, with frequencies of approximately 155 kHz to 60 kHz.

== Habitat and ecology ==
The golden-tipped bat has been mainly recorded in rainforest or wet sclerophyll forest. It has also been recorded in dry sclerophyll forest. They live at elevations up to 1,000m.

=== Roosting ===
They make diurnal roosts ranging from 0.5 to 9.0 m (1.6 to 29.5 ft) above the ground, roosting on the branches of trees or in tree hollows. Female bats use the canopy of a tree for a maternity site; Roosts, and their broken patterns of pelage, enable this species to hide from their predators.

== Diet and foraging strategies ==
=== Diet ===
Araneida such as orb-weaver and big-jawed spiders are the main food of golden-tipped bats; as shown by the high proportion of Araneida body fragments among the particles lodged among the bats' teeth and fur. Even though Araneida is a major food source for the golden-tipped bat, these bats also consume insects which belong to the insect orders Coleoptera (beetles) and Lepidoptera (butterflies and moths).

=== Foraging strategies ===
The golden-tipped bat uses multiple foraging strategies to hunt. One is ground gleaning. They also hover-glean, flying slowly and taking prey from elevated places such as high tree trunks. The golden tipped bat use broad bandwidth echolocation to find precise localization of a target. Additionally, they use high frequency echolocation to find stationary prey such as spiders on their webs.
