= Northern freetail bat =

Conservation status
- Least Concern (IUCN 3.1)

Scientific classification
- Kingdom: Animalia
- Phylum: Chordata
- Class: Mammalia
- Order: Chiroptera
- Family: Molossidae
- Genus: Mops
- Species: M. jobensis

Binomial name
- Mops jobensis (Miller, 1902)

Synonyms
- Nyctinomus jobensis N. plicatus Tadarida jobensis

Species of bat

The northern freetail bat (Mops jobensis) is a species of bat found in Yapen, Seram Island, Western New Guinea and Northern Australia.

== Taxonomy and etymology ==
It was described as a new species in 1902 by American zoologist Gerrit Smith Miller Jr. Miller placed it in the now-defunct genus Nyctinomus, naming it Nyctinomus jobensis. Miller likely chose the species name "jobensis" because the holotype was discovered on Jobie Island near the community of Ansus. The holotype was collected by Italian naturalist Odoardo Beccari.

== Description ==
It has been described as having "features reminiscent of Darth Vader." From head to tail, it is approximately 98 mm (3.9 in) long. Its head and body is 80–90 mm (3.1–3.5 in) long, and its tail is 35–45 mm (1.4–1.8 in) long. Its forearm is 46–52 mm (1.8–2.0 in) long. It weighs 20–30 g (0.71–1.06 oz).

== Biology and behavior ==
They will fly and forage in groups of two or more individuals. Its foraging style utilizes fast, direct flight suited for open areas or above canopies. It is insectivorous, consuming beetles, bugs, moths, lacewings, grasshoppers, cockroaches, flies and leafhoppers. It is one of the only species of bat in Australia that can be heard when foraging. Its typical echolocation frequency is relatively low (16-25kHz), overlapping with the upper range of sounds audible to humans. Lower frequency sounds down to below 10kHz have been recorded, with speculation that these are more likely to relate to social calls. It is nocturnal, roosting in sheltered places during the day such as tree hollows or caves. These roosts can consist of many individuals, as it is a colonial species.

== Range and habitat ==
It prefers to forage in the tropical savannas of Northern Australia. It is also found in urban areas, using artificial lights to forage for the insects attracted to them.

== Conservation ==
It is currently evaluated as least concern by the IUCN—its lowest conservation priority. It meets the criteria for this assessment because it has a large geographic range, a large population, it occurs in protected areas, and it tolerates human modification of landscapes. Its population trend is stable.
