= Ozimops =

Scientific classification
- Domain: Eukaryota
- Kingdom: Animalia
- Phylum: Chordata
- Class: Mammalia
- Order: Chiroptera
- Family: Molossidae
- Genus: Ozimops; Reardon et al, 2014.

Genus of bats

Ozimops is a genus of molossid bats found in Australia, Indonesia and Papua New Guinea.

== Description ==
Ozimops are small and stout microbats, with forearm measurement ranging from 29 to 41 millimetres and weigh from 6 to 18 grams. The ears are triangular in outline, rounded at the tip and not joined, being separated by 2 to 4 mm. The tragus within the ear is also rounded at the point and broader at the base, the antitragus is semicircular or indistinct and the skin is thickened in this section of the ear. The ears are raised up from a lateral position when the bat is alert. Their muzzles are distinguished as broad and convex, and tapering out toward the end. The top of the snout is covered in short and fine fur, interspersed with short whiskery vibrissae, although not the longer bristles found in the related species Setirostris eleryi (Mormopterus eleryi).

With an exception in several of the species, and especially Ozimops halli, the dental formula is 1/2, 1/1, 2/2, 3/3 = 30. The variation to this is the loss of a tooth in mature individuals, the upper anterior premolar, at one or both sides of the jaw.

== Taxonomy ==
The taxon was first published as subgenus of Mormopterus in 2014, separating Australian groups whose diversity was reviewed and described as new species. The content of the new taxon was established or formerly cryptic taxa of Indo-Papuan species and a centre of diversity at the Australian mainland. This was elevated to the rank of genus in 2015.

The arrangement of the genus may be summarised as,

- genus Ozimops Reardon, McKenzie & Adams, 2014. citing subgenus Ozimops Reardon et al, 2014.
  - sp. Ozimops beccarii (Peters, 1881)
  - sp. Ozimops cobourgianus (Johnson, 1959).
    Tadarida loriae cobourgiana Johnson, 1959.
  - sp. Ozimops halli Reardon et al, 2014.
    sp. Mormopterus (Ozimops) halli Reardon et al, 2014.
  - sp. Ozimops kitcheneri Reardon et al, 2014.
    Mormopterus (Ozimops) kitcheneri Reardon et al, 2014.
  - sp. Ozimops loriae (Thomas, 1897)
  - sp. Ozimops lumsdenae Reardon et al, 2014.
    Mormopterus (Ozimops) lumsdenae Reardon et al, 2014.
  - sp. Ozimops petersi (Leche, 1884)
    Nyctinomus petersi Leche, 1884
  - sp. Ozimops planiceps (Peters, 1866).
    Nyctinomus planiceps Peters, 1866;
    Molossus wilcoxii Krefft, 1873.
  - sp. Ozimops ridei (Felten, 1964).
    Tadarida loriae ridei Felten, 1964.
