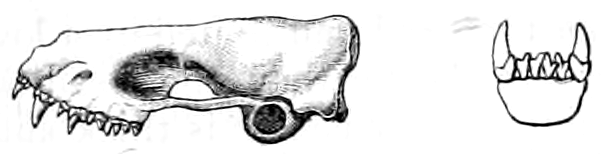
- illustration of female skull and jaw, 1884

Conservation status
- Least Concern (IUCN 3.1)

Scientific classification
- Kingdom: Animalia
- Phylum: Chordata
- Class: Mammalia
- Order: Chiroptera
- Family: Molossidae
- Genus: Ozimops
- Species: O. petersi

Binomial name
- Ozimops petersi (Leche, 1884)

Synonyms
- Nyctinomus petersi Leche, 1884

= Ozimops petersi =

Inland free-tailed bat

Species of bat

Ozimops petersi, the inland free-tailed bat is a species of bat found in Australia.

It is notable for being able to tolerate the most extreme body temperature range of any known mammal.

== Taxonomy ==
It was initially described in 1884 by Swedish zoologist Dr. Wilhelm Leche. Leche had acquired a collection of specimens from Gustav Schneider, a Swiss natural history dealer, and used to describe a new species that was distinguishable from the rest of the series.

In 1906, Oldfield Thomas published a paper in which he considered N. petersi as synonymous with an earlier description of species Mormopterus planiceps (Ozimops planiceps, in part).

This status was largely maintained until 2014, although greater diversity had previously been identified, when a study examining the morphology and genetics of the bats of Australia showed that it was distinct enough to be considered a full species. This description removed the name from a synonymy of M. planiceps, publishing a subgeneric arrangement Mormopterus (Ozimops) petersi before that was elevated to genus Ozimops.

Leche initially placed it in the now defunct genus Nyctinomus with the species name petersi.

== Description ==
In describing the species, Leche noted that it is similar in appearance to the east-coast free-tailed bat, Mormopterus norfolkensis. He wrote that it differs in its flat, compressed skull. It is a small species of bat, with a head and body length of 57 mm (2.2 in), a tail length of 33 mm (1.3 in), and a forearm length of 34 mm (1.3 in). The tail extends approximately 12 mm (0.47 in) past the edge of the uropatagium. Its tragus is tiny, at only 3 mm (0.12 in) long. It weighs 7.5–11.8 g (0.26–0.42 oz).

== Biology ==
Ozimops petersi is nocturnal species, roosting in sheltered places during the day such as tree cavities or under metal roofs. Females have one breeding season annually, and give birth in November or December. The litter size is generally one individual, with the young called a "pup."

=== Body temperature toleration ===
This species of bat can tolerate the most extreme range of body temperatures of any known mammal. Its body temperature has been recorded as low as 3.3 °C (37.9 °F) and as high as 45.8 °C (114.4 °F). This upper limit even exceeds recorded maximum body temperatures of camels. These bats can survive these otherwise lethal extremes by using torpor, which is a physiological adaptation.

== Conservation ==
As of 2020, it is listed as least concern by the IUCN—its lowest conservation priority. It meets the criteria for this assessment because it has a large geographic range; it tolerates a variety of habitats; its population size is thought to be large; and it is documented regularly throughout its range. Its population may exceed one million individuals, although this number may be declining.
