= List of emballonurids =

Species in mammal family Emballonuridae

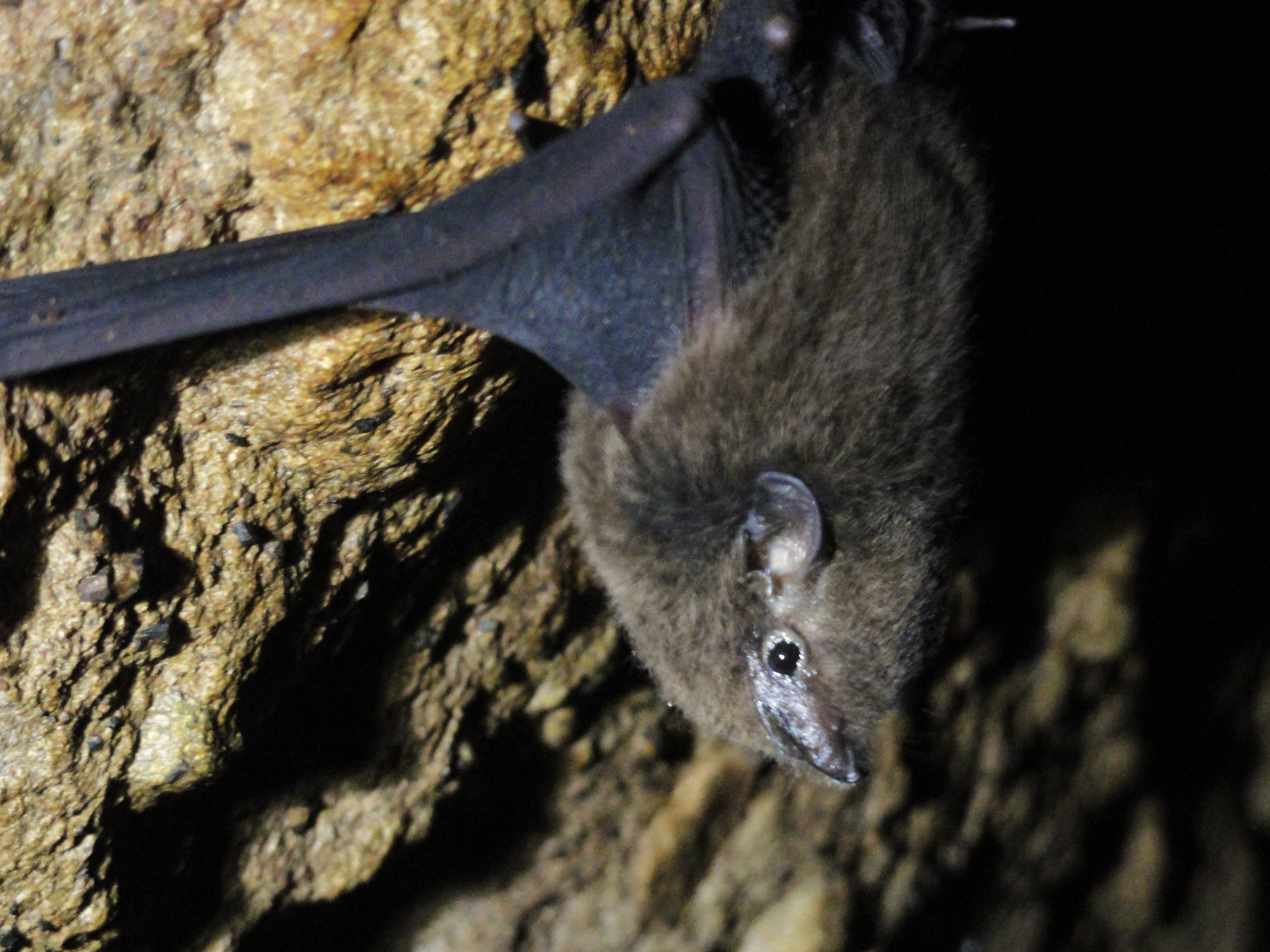
Pacific sheath-tailed bat (Emballonura semicaudata)

Emballonuridae is one of the twenty families of bats in the mammalian order Chiroptera and part of the Yangochiroptera suborder. Members of this family are called emballonurids, and include sheath-tailed bats, sac-winged bats, and tomb bats. They are found in all continents except Europe and Antarctica, primarily in forests and caves, though some species can also be found in shrublands, savannas, rocky areas, or deserts. They range in size from the Amazonian sac-winged bat, at 3 cm (1 in) plus a 1 cm (0.4 in) tail, to the Pel's pouched bat, at 14 cm (6 in) plus a 4 cm (2 in) tail. Like all bats, emballonurids are capable of true and sustained flight, and have forearm lengths ranging from 3 cm (1 in) to 10 cm (4 in). They are all insectivorous and eat a variety of insects and spiders, and occasionally fruit. Almost no emballonurids have population estimates, though three species—the Pacific sheath-tailed bat, Antioquian sac-winged bat, and Hildegarde's tomb bat—are categorized as endangered species, and one species—the Seychelles sheath-tailed bat—is categorized as critically endangered with a population as low as 50.

The 55 extant species of Emballonuridae are divided between two subfamilies: Emballonurinae and Taphozoinae. Emballonurinae contains 36 species in 12 genera, and Taphozoinae contains 18 species in 2 genera. A few extinct prehistoric emballonurid species have been discovered, though due to ongoing research and discoveries the exact number and categorization is not fixed.

== Conventions ==
IUCN Red List categories
Conservation status
- EX: Extinct (0 species)
- EW: Extinct in the wild (0 species)
- CR: Critically endangered (1 species)
- EN: Endangered (3 species)
- VU: Vulnerable (3 species)
- NT: Near threatened (2 species)
- LC: Least concern (38 species)

Other categories
- DD: Data deficient (7 species)
- NE: Not evaluated (1 species)

The author citation for the species or genus is given after the scientific name; parentheses around the author citation indicate that this was not the original taxonomic placement. Conservation status codes listed follow the International Union for Conservation of Nature (IUCN) Red List of Threatened Species. Range maps are provided wherever possible; if a range map is not available, a description of the emballonurid's range is provided. Ranges are based on the IUCN Red List for that species unless otherwise noted. Population figures are rounded to the nearest hundred.

== Classification ==
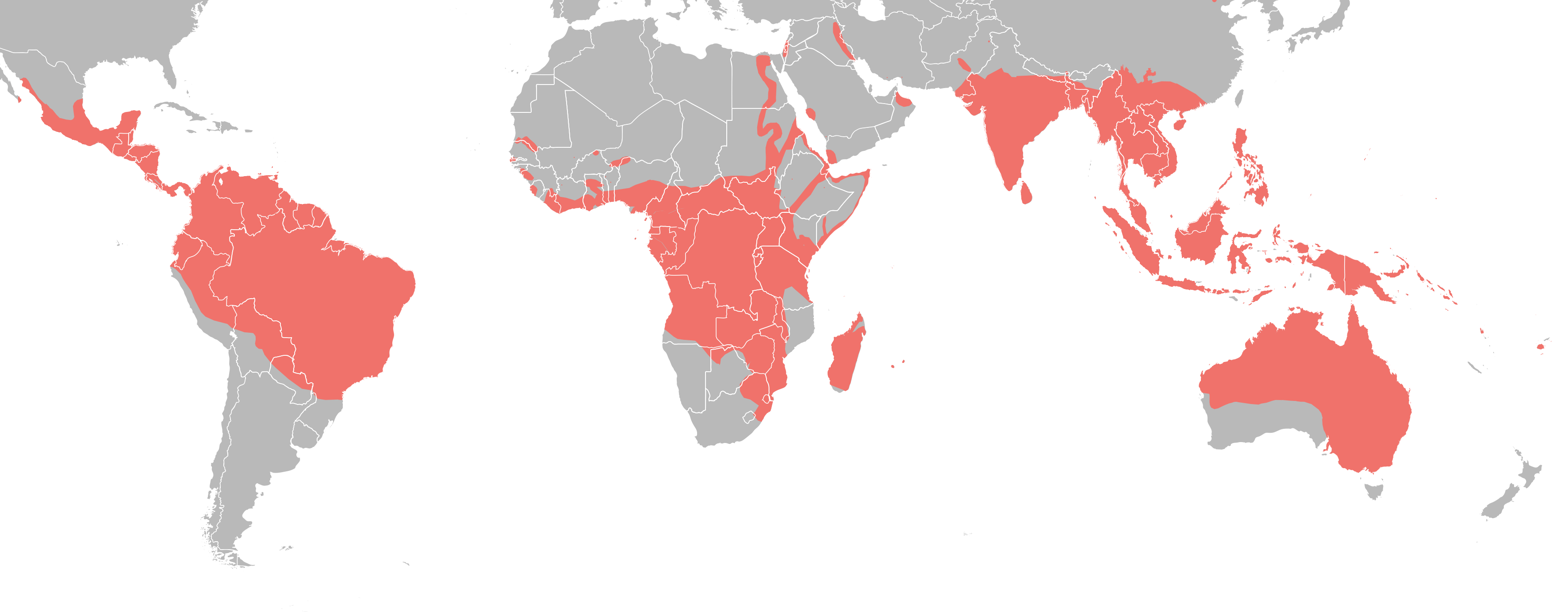
Emballonuridae distribution

The family Emballonuridae consists of two subfamilies: Emballonurinae, containing 37 species divided into 12 genera, and Taphozoinae, which contains 18 species in 2 genera.

Family Emballonuridae

- Subfamily Emballonurinae
  - Genus Balantiopteryx (sac-winged bats): three species
  - Genus Centronycteris (shaggy bats): two species
  - Genus Coleura (sheath-tailed bats): four species
  - Genus Cormura (chestnut sac-winged bat): one species
  - Genus Cyttarops (short-eared bat): one species
  - Genus Diclidurus (ghost bats): four species
  - Genus Emballonura (sheath-tailed bats): eight species
  - Genus Mosia (dark sheath-tailed bat): one species
  - Genus Paremballonura (false sheath-tailed bats): two species
  - Genus Peropteryx (dog-like bats): five species
  - Genus Rhynchonycteris (proboscis bat): one species
  - Genus Saccopteryx (sac-winged bats): five species
- Subfamily Taphozoinae
  - Genus Saccolaimus (pouched bats): four species
  - Genus Taphozous (tomb bats): fourteen species

== Emballonurids ==
The following classification is based on the taxonomy described by the reference work Mammal Species of the World (2005), with augmentation by generally accepted proposals made since using molecular phylogenetic analysis, as supported by both the IUCN SSC Bat Specialist Group and the American Society of Mammalogists.

=== Subfamily Emballonurinae ===
Genus Balantiopteryx – Peters, 1867 – three species
Common name	Scientific name and subspecies	Range	Size and ecology	IUCN status and estimated population
Ecuadorian sac-winged bat	B. infusca (Thomas, 1897)	Colombia and Ecuador	Size: 3–5 cm (1–2 in), plus 1–2 cm (0.4–0.8 in) tail 3–5 cm (1–2 in) forearm length Habitat: Forest and caves	VU Unknown
Gray sac-winged bat	B. plicata Peters, 1867 Two subspecies: B. p. pallida; B. p. plicata	Mexico and Central America	Size: 4–6 cm (2 in), plus 1–3 cm (0.4–1.2 in) tail 3–5 cm (1–2 in) forearm length Habitat: Forest and shrubland	LC Unknown
Thomas's sac-winged bat	B. io Thomas, 1904	Mexico and Central America	Size: 3–5 cm (1–2 in), plus 1–2 cm (0.4–0.8 in) tail 3–5 cm (1–2 in) forearm length Habitat: Caves and forest	VU Unknown

Genus Centronycteris – Gray, 1838 – two species
Common name	Scientific name and subspecies	Range	Size and ecology	IUCN status and estimated population
Shaggy bat	C. maximiliani J. B. Fischer, 1829	Northern and eastern South America	Size: 4–7 cm (2–3 in), plus 2–3 cm (1 in) tail 4–5 cm (2 in) forearm length Habitat: Forest	LC Unknown
Thomas's shaggy bat	C. centralis Thomas, 1912	Mexico, Central America, and northern South America	Size: 4–6 cm (2 in), plus 1–4 cm (0.4–1.6 in) tail 4–5 cm (2 in) forearm length Habitat: Forest	LC Unknown

Genus Coleura – Peters, 1867 – four species
Common name	Scientific name and subspecies	Range	Size and ecology	IUCN status and estimated population
African sheath-tailed bat	C. afra (Peters, 1852)	Scattered Sub-Saharan Africa	Size: 5–7 cm (2–3 in), plus 1–2 cm (0.4–0.8 in) tail 4–6 cm (2 in) forearm length Habitat: Desert, caves, shrubland, savanna, and forest	LC Unknown
Madagascar sheath-tailed bat	C. kibomalandy Goodman, Puechmaille, Friedli-Weyeneth, Gerlach, Ruedi, Schoeman, Stanley, & Teeling, 2012	Madagascar	Size: 6–7 cm (2–3 in), plus 1–2 cm (0.4–0.8 in) tail 4–6 cm (2 in) forearm length Habitat: Forest	DD Unknown
Seychelles sheath-tailed bat	C. seychellensis (Peters, 1868) Two subspecies: C. s. seychellensis; C. s. silhouettae	Seychelles	Size: 5–7 cm (2–3 in), plus unknown tail 4–6 cm (2 in) forearm length Habitat: Forest, inland wetlands, and caves	CR 50–100
Somali sheath-tailed bat	C. gallarum Thomas, 1915	Eastern Africa and Arabian Peninsula	Size: Unknown length 4–5 cm (2 in) forearm length Habitat: Desert, caves, shrubland, savanna, and forest	NE Unknown

Genus Cormura – Peters, 1867 – one species
Common name	Scientific name and subspecies	Range	Size and ecology	IUCN status and estimated population
Chestnut sac-winged bat	C. brevirostris (Wagner, 1843)	Central America and northern South America	Size: 4–6 cm (2 in), plus 1–2 cm (0.4–0.8 in) tail 4–5 cm (2 in) forearm length Habitat: Forest	LC Unknown

Genus Cyttarops – Thomas, 1913 – one species
Common name	Scientific name and subspecies	Range	Size and ecology	IUCN status and estimated population
Short-eared bat	C. alecto Thomas, 1913	Central America and northern South America	Size: 4–6 cm (2 in), plus 2–3 cm (1 in) tail 4–5 cm (2 in) forearm length Habitat: Forest	LC Unknown

Genus Diclidurus – Wied-Neuwied, 1820 – four species
Common name	Scientific name and subspecies	Range	Size and ecology	IUCN status and estimated population
Greater ghost bat	D. ingens Hernandez-Camacho, 1955	Northern South America	Size: About 8 cm (3 in), plus about 2 cm (1 in) tail 6–8 cm (2–3 in) forearm length Habitat: Forest	DD Unknown
Isabelle's ghost bat	D. isabellus Thomas, 1920	Northern South America	Size: About 7 cm (3 in), plus 1–3 cm (0.4–1.2 in) tail about 5 cm (2 in) forearm length Habitat: Forest	LC Unknown
Lesser ghost bat	D. scutatus Peters, 1869	Northern South America	Size: 5–7 cm (2–3 in), plus 1–2 cm (0.4–0.8 in) tail 5–6 cm (2 in) forearm length Habitat: Forest	LC Unknown
Northern ghost bat	D. albus Wied-Neuwied, 1820 Two subspecies: D. a. albus; D. a. virgo	Mexico, Central America, and South America	Size: 6–9 cm (2–4 in), plus 1–8 cm (0.4–3.1 in) tail 6–7 cm (2–3 in) forearm length Habitat: Forest	LC Unknown

Genus Emballonura – Temminck, 1838 – eight species
Common name	Scientific name and subspecies	Range	Size and ecology	IUCN status and estimated population
Beccari's sheath-tailed bat	E. beccarii Peters & Doria, 1881 Three subspecies: E. b. beccarii; E. b. clavium; E. b. meeki	Indonesia and Papua New Guinea	Size: 3–5 cm (1–2 in), plus 1–3 cm (0.4–1.2 in) tail 3–5 cm (1–2 in) forearm length Habitat: Forest and caves	LC Unknown
Greater sheath-tailed bat	E. furax Thomas, 1911	Indonesia and Papua New Guinea	Size: 5–7 cm (2–3 in), plus 1–2 cm (0.4–0.8 in) tail 4–6 cm (2 in) forearm length Habitat: Forest and caves	LC Unknown
Large-eared sheath-tailed bat	E. dianae Hill, 1956 Three subspecies: E. d. dianae; E. d. fruhstorferi; E. d. rickwoodi	Papua New Guinea and the Solomon Islands	Size: 4–7 cm (2–3 in), plus 1–2 cm (0.4–0.8 in) tail 4–5 cm (2 in) forearm length Habitat: Forest and caves	LC Unknown
Lesser sheath-tailed bat	E. monticola Temminck, 1838	Southeastern Asia	Size: 4–5 cm (2 in), plus 1–2 cm (0.4–0.8 in) tail 3–5 cm (1–2 in) forearm length Habitat: Forest, rocky areas, and caves	LC Unknown
Pacific sheath-tailed bat	E. semicaudata Peale, 1848 Four subspecies: E. s. palauensis; E. s. rotensis; E. s. semicaudata; E. s. sulcata	Polynesia and Micronesia	Size: 4–5 cm (2 in), plus unknown tail 4–5 cm (2 in) forearm length Habitat: Forest, rocky areas, and caves	EN Unknown
Raffray's sheath-tailed bat	E. raffrayana Dobson, 1879 Three subspecies: E. r. cor; E. r. raffrayana; E. r. stresemanni	Indonesia, Papua New Guinea, and the Solomon Islands	Size: 3–6 cm (1–2 in), plus 1–2 cm (0.4–0.8 in) tail 3–5 cm (1–2 in) forearm length Habitat: Caves and forest	LC Unknown
Seri's sheath-tailed bat	E. serii Flannery, 1994	Indonesia and Papua New Guinea	Size: 4–7 cm (2–3 in), plus 1–2 cm (0.4–0.8 in) tail 4–6 cm (2 in) forearm length Habitat: Forest and caves	VU Unknown
Small Asian sheath-tailed bat	E. alecto (Eydoux & Gervais, 1836) Four subspecies: E. a. alecto; E. a. anambensis; E. a. palawanensis; E. a. rivalis	Borneo, Sulawesi, and the Philippines	Size: 4–5 cm (2 in), plus 1–2 cm (0.4–0.8 in) tail 4–5 cm (2 in) forearm length Habitat: Forest and caves	LC Unknown

Genus Mosia – Gray, 1843 – one species
Common name	Scientific name and subspecies	Range	Size and ecology	IUCN status and estimated population
Dark sheath-tailed bat	M. nigrescens Gray, 1843 Three subspecies: M. n. nigrescens; M. n. papuana; M. n. solomonis	Indonesia, Papua New Guinea, and the Solomon Islands	Size: 3–5 cm (1–2 in), plus 1–2 cm (0.4–0.8 in) tail 3–4 cm (1–2 in) forearm length Habitat: Forest, rocky areas, and caves	LC Unknown

Genus Paremballonura – Goodman, Puechmaille, Friedli-Weyeneth, Gerlach, Ruedi, Schoeman, Stanley, & Teeling, 2012 – two species
Common name	Scientific name and subspecies	Range	Size and ecology	IUCN status and estimated population
Peters's sheath-tailed bat	P. atrata Peters, 1874	Eastern Madagascar	Size: 4–5 cm (2 in), plus 1–2 cm (0.4–0.8 in) tail 3–5 cm (1–2 in) forearm length Habitat: Forest and caves	LC Unknown
Western sheath-tailed bat	P. tiavato (Goodman, Cardiff, Ranivo, Russell, & Yoder, 2006)	Western Madagascar	Size: 4–5 cm (2 in), plus 1–2 cm (0.4–0.8 in) tail 3–5 cm (1–2 in) forearm length Habitat: Forest and caves	LC Unknown

Genus Peropteryx – Peters, 1867 – five species
Common name	Scientific name and subspecies	Range	Size and ecology	IUCN status and estimated population
Greater dog-like bat	P. kappleri Peters, 1867 Two subspecies: P. k. intermedia; P. k. kappleri	Mexico, Central America, and South America	Size: 6–8 cm (2–3 in), plus 1–2 cm (0.4–0.8 in) tail 4–6 cm (2 in) forearm length Habitat: Forest and caves	LC Unknown
Lesser dog-like bat	P. macrotis Wagner, 1843	Mexico, Central America, and South America	Size: 4–6 cm (2 in), plus 1–2 cm (0.4–0.8 in) tail 3–5 cm (1–2 in) forearm length Habitat: Forest and shrubland	LC Unknown
Pale-winged dog-like bat	P. pallidoptera Lim, Engstrom, Reid, Simmons, Voss, & Fleck, 2010	Northwestern South America	Size: 4–6 cm (2 in), plus 1–2 cm (0.4–0.8 in) tail 3–5 cm (1–2 in) forearm length Habitat: Forest	DD Unknown
Trinidad dog-like bat	P. trinitatis Miller, 1899 Two subspecies: P. t. phaea; P. t. trinitatis	Northeastern South America	Size: 4–5 cm (2 in), plus 1–2 cm (0.4–0.8 in) tail 3–5 cm (1–2 in) forearm length Habitat: Forest and caves	DD Unknown
White-winged dog-like bat	P. leucoptera Peters, 1867 Two subspecies: P. l. cyclops; P. l. leucoptera	Northern South America	Size: 4–6 cm (2 in), plus 1–2 cm (0.4–0.8 in) tail 4–6 cm (2 in) forearm length Habitat: Forest and caves	LC Unknown

Genus Rhynchonycteris – Peters, 1867 – one species
Common name	Scientific name and subspecies	Range	Size and ecology	IUCN status and estimated population
Proboscis bat	R. naso (Wied-Neuwied, 1820)	Mexico, Central America, and South America	Size: 3–5 cm (1–2 in), plus 1–2 cm (0.4–0.8 in) tail 3–4 cm (1–2 in) forearm length Habitat: Forest and caves	LC Unknown

Genus Saccopteryx – Illiger, 1811 – five species
Common name	Scientific name and subspecies	Range	Size and ecology	IUCN status and estimated population
Amazonian sac-winged bat	S. gymnura Thomas, 1901	Northern South America	Size: 3–4 cm (1–2 in), plus 1–2 cm (0.4–0.8 in) tail 3–4 cm (1–2 in) forearm length Habitat: Forest	DD Unknown
Antioquian sac-winged bat	S. antioquensis Muñoz & Cuartas, 2001	Colombia	Size: 4–5 cm (2 in), plus 1–2 cm (0.4–0.8 in) tail 3–4 cm (1–2 in) forearm length Habitat: Forest and caves	EN Unknown
Frosted sac-winged bat	S. canescens Thomas, 1901 Two subspecies: S. c. canescens; S. c. pumila	Northern South America	Size: 3–5 cm (1–2 in), plus 1–2 cm (0.4–0.8 in) tail 3–4 cm (1–2 in) forearm length Habitat: Forest	LC Unknown
Greater sac-winged bat	S. bilineata (Temminck, 1838)	Mexico, Central America, and South America	Size: 4–6 cm (2 in), plus 1–3 cm (0.4–1.2 in) tail 4–5 cm (2 in) forearm length Habitat: Forest and caves	LC Unknown
Lesser sac-winged bat	S. leptura Schreber, 1774	Mexico, Central America, and South America	Size: 3–6 cm (1–2 in), plus 1–2 cm (0.4–0.8 in) tail 3–5 cm (1–2 in) forearm length Habitat: Forest	LC Unknown

=== Subfamily Taphozoinae ===
Genus Saccolaimus – Temminck, 1838 – four species
Common name	Scientific name and subspecies	Range	Size and ecology	IUCN status and estimated population
Naked-rumped pouched bat	S. saccolaimus Temminck, 1838 Five subspecies: S. s. affinis; S. s. crassus; S. s. nudicluniatus; S. s. pluto; S. s. saccolaimus	Southern and southeastern Asia and northern Australia	Size: 8–10 cm (3–4 in), plus 2–4 cm (1–2 in) tail 6–8 cm (2–3 in) forearm length Habitat: Forest, savanna, and caves	LC Unknown
Papuan sheath-tailed bat	S. mixtus Troughton, 1925	Southern New Guinea and northern Australia	Size: 7–8 cm (3 in), plus 2–3 cm (1 in) tail 6–7 cm (2–3 in) forearm length Habitat: Forest, savanna, and caves	NT Unknown
Pel's pouched bat	S. peli Temminck, 1853	Western and central Africa	Size: 11–14 cm (4–6 in), plus 2–4 cm (1–2 in) tail 8–10 cm (3–4 in) forearm length Habitat: Forest	LC Unknown
Yellow-bellied sheath-tailed bat	S. flaviventris Peters, 1867	Australia and Papua New Guinea	Size: 7–9 cm (3–4 in), plus 2–4 cm (1–2 in) tail 7–9 cm (3–4 in) forearm length Habitat: Forest, savanna, and shrubland	LC Unknown

Genus Taphozous – Geoffroy, 1818 – fourteen species
Common name	Scientific name and subspecies	Range	Size and ecology	IUCN status and estimated population
Arnhem sheath-tailed bat	T. kapalgensis McKean & Friend, 1979	Northwestern Australia	Size: 7–9 cm (3–4 in), plus 2–3 cm (1 in) tail 5–7 cm (2–3 in) forearm length Habitat: Forest, savanna, and grassland	LC Unknown
Black-bearded tomb bat	T. melanopogon Temminck, 1841 Five subspecies: T. m. bicolor; T. m. cavaticus; T. m. fretensis; T. m. melanopogon; T. m. phillipinensis	Southern and southeastern Asia	Size: 6–9 cm (2–4 in), plus 1–3 cm (0.4–1.2 in) tail 6–7 cm (2–3 in) forearm length Habitat: Forest, shrubland, and caves	LC Unknown
Coastal sheath-tailed bat	T. australis Gould, 1854	Northern Australia	Size: 7–9 cm (3–4 in), plus 2–3 cm (1 in) tail 6–7 cm (2–3 in) forearm length Habitat: Forest, shrubland, caves, and coastal marine	NT 9,000–10,000
Common sheath-tailed bat	T. georgianus Thomas, 1915	Northern and northwestern Australia	Size: 6–8 cm (2–3 in), plus 2–4 cm (1–2 in) tail 6–8 cm (2–3 in) forearm length Habitat: Savanna, rocky areas, and caves	LC Unknown
Egyptian tomb bat	T. perforatus Geoffroy, 1818 Four subspecies: T. p. haedinus; T. p. perforatus; T. p. senegalensis; T. p. sudani	Scattered Africa and western and southern Asia	Size: 7–9 cm (3–4 in), plus 2–3 cm (1 in) tail 5–7 cm (2–3 in) forearm length Habitat: Savanna and inland wetlands	LC Unknown
Hamilton's tomb bat	T. hamiltoni Thomas, 1920	Central Africa	Size: 8–9 cm (3–4 in), plus 2–4 cm (1–2 in) tail 6–8 cm (2–3 in) forearm length Habitat: Savanna and unknown	DD Unknown
Hildegarde's tomb bat	T. hildegardeae Thomas, 1909	Kenya and Tanzania	Size: 7–9 cm (3–4 in), plus 2–3 cm (1 in) tail 6–7 cm (2–3 in) forearm length Habitat: Forest and caves	EN Unknown
Hill's sheath-tailed bat	T. hilli Kitchener, 1980	Australia	Size: 6–9 cm (2–4 in), plus 2–4 cm (1–2 in) tail 6–8 cm (2–3 in) forearm length Habitat: Savanna, shrubland, grassland, rocky areas, caves, and desert	LC Unknown
Indonesian tomb bat	T. achates Thomas, 1915 Two subspecies: T. a. achates; T. a. minor	Indonesia	Size: 7–8 cm (3 in), plus 2–3 cm (1 in) tail 5–7 cm (2–3 in) forearm length Habitat: Forest and caves	DD Unknown
Long-winged tomb bat	T. longimanus Hardwicke, 1825 Four subspecies: T. l. albipinnis; T. l. kampenii; T. l. leucopleurus; T. l. longimanus	Southern and southeastern Asia	Size: 7–9 cm (3–4 in), plus 2–3 cm (1 in) tail 5–7 cm (2–3 in) forearm length Habitat: Forest, savanna, rocky areas, and caves	LC Unknown
Mauritian tomb bat	T. mauritianus Geoffroy, 1818	Sub-Saharan Africa	Size: 7–9 cm (3–4 in), plus 1–3 cm (0.4–1.2 in) tail 5–7 cm (2–3 in) forearm length Habitat: Forest, savanna, shrubland, and rocky areas	LC Unknown
Naked-rumped tomb bat	T. nudiventris Cretzschmar, 1830 Five subspecies: T. n. kachhensis; T. n. magnus; T. n. nudaster; T. n. nudiventris; T. n. zayidi	Scattered Africa and western and southern Asia	Size: 8–11 cm (3–4 in), plus 2–5 cm (1–2 in) tail 7–8 cm (3 in) forearm length Habitat: Savanna, shrubland, grassland, inland wetlands, caves, and desert	LC Unknown
Theobald's tomb bat	T. theobaldi Dobson, 1872 Two subspecies: T. t. secatus; T. t. theobaldi	Southern and southeastern Asia	Size: 8–10 cm (3–4 in), plus 2–3 cm (1 in) tail 7–8 cm (3 in) forearm length Habitat: Forest and caves	LC Unknown
Troughton's sheath-tailed bat	T. troughtoni Tate, 1952	Northeastern Australia	Size: 7–9 cm (3–4 in), plus 3–4 cm (1–2 in) tail 7–8 cm (3 in) forearm length Habitat: Savanna, rocky areas, and caves	LC Unknown

== Sources ==
- Chernasky, Amy; Motis, Anna; Burgin, Connor, eds. (2023). All the Mammals of the World. Lynx Nature Books. ISBN 978-84-16728-66-4.
- Simmons, Nancy B. (2005). Wilson, Don E.; Reeder, DeeAnn M. (eds.). Mammal Species of the World. Vol. 1 (3rd ed.). Johns Hopkins University Press. ISBN 978-0-8018-8221-0.
- Nowak, Ronald M. (1994). Walker's Bats of the World. Johns Hopkins University Press. ISBN 978-0-8018-4986-2.
