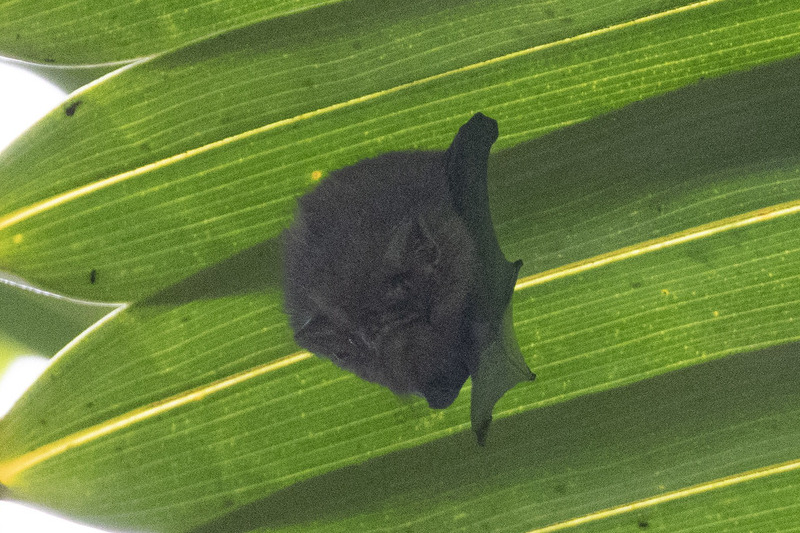

Conservation status
- Least Concern (IUCN 3.1)

Scientific classification
- Kingdom: Animalia
- Phylum: Chordata
- Class: Mammalia
- Order: Chiroptera
- Family: Emballonuridae
- Genus: Cyttarops; Thomas, 1913
- Species: C. alecto

Binomial name
- Cyttarops alecto Thomas, 1913
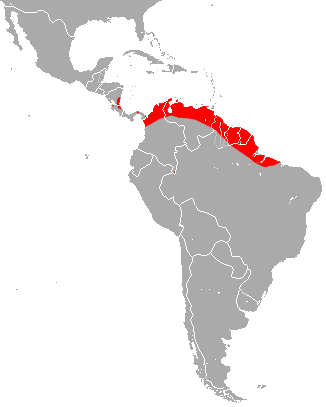
- Short-eared bat range

= Short-eared bat =

Species of bat

The short-eared bat (Cyttarops alecto) is a bat species found in Brazil, Costa Rica, Guyana and Nicaragua. It is the only species within its genus.

== Description ==
The short-eared bat is a dark-colored sac-winged bat, similar in appearance to Saccopteryx or Peropteryx, but differentiated by its long, silky fur, low rounded ears, expanded clavicles, grooved tibia, and cranial frontal cup. Forearms range from 46 to 47 millimetres (1.8 to 1.9 in) long. Skull length ranges from 13 to 14 millimetres (0.51 to 0.55 in). Females tend to be somewhat larger than males. As with all emballonurid bats, short-eared bats use a type of echolocation call that consists of a central, narrowband component and one or two short, frequency-modulated sweeps. All calls are multi-harmonic with most energy concentrated in the second harmonic.

== Range and population ==
The currently known range of this species extends from the Caribbean lowlands of Costa Rica through Guyana to the state of Pará, Brazil, and it has never been found in elevations below 300 metres (980 ft). The exact population size of the short-eared bat is unknown, but this is one of the rarest Neotropical bats, known from fewer than twenty individuals taken from less than ten localities in humid lowland areas. They face no immediate threats and are listed as being of Least Concern by the IUCN.

== Behavior ==
Aerial insectivores, Cyttarops alecto roosts in small groups of one to ten individuals of both sexes and mixed ages under fronds of coco palms during the day. It hangs freely by the feet when roosting near the midrib of a frond. They are nocturnal, so activity doesn't usually start until about 45 minutes after sunset and is usually restricted to the immediate area around the roost for the first 15 to 30 minutes. Once it is completely dark, individuals disperse, flying at least 3 to 4 meters above ground. Roosts are often located in exposed places, and even by buildings, actively occupied by humans, demonstrating they can be adaptable to human-disturbed areas.
