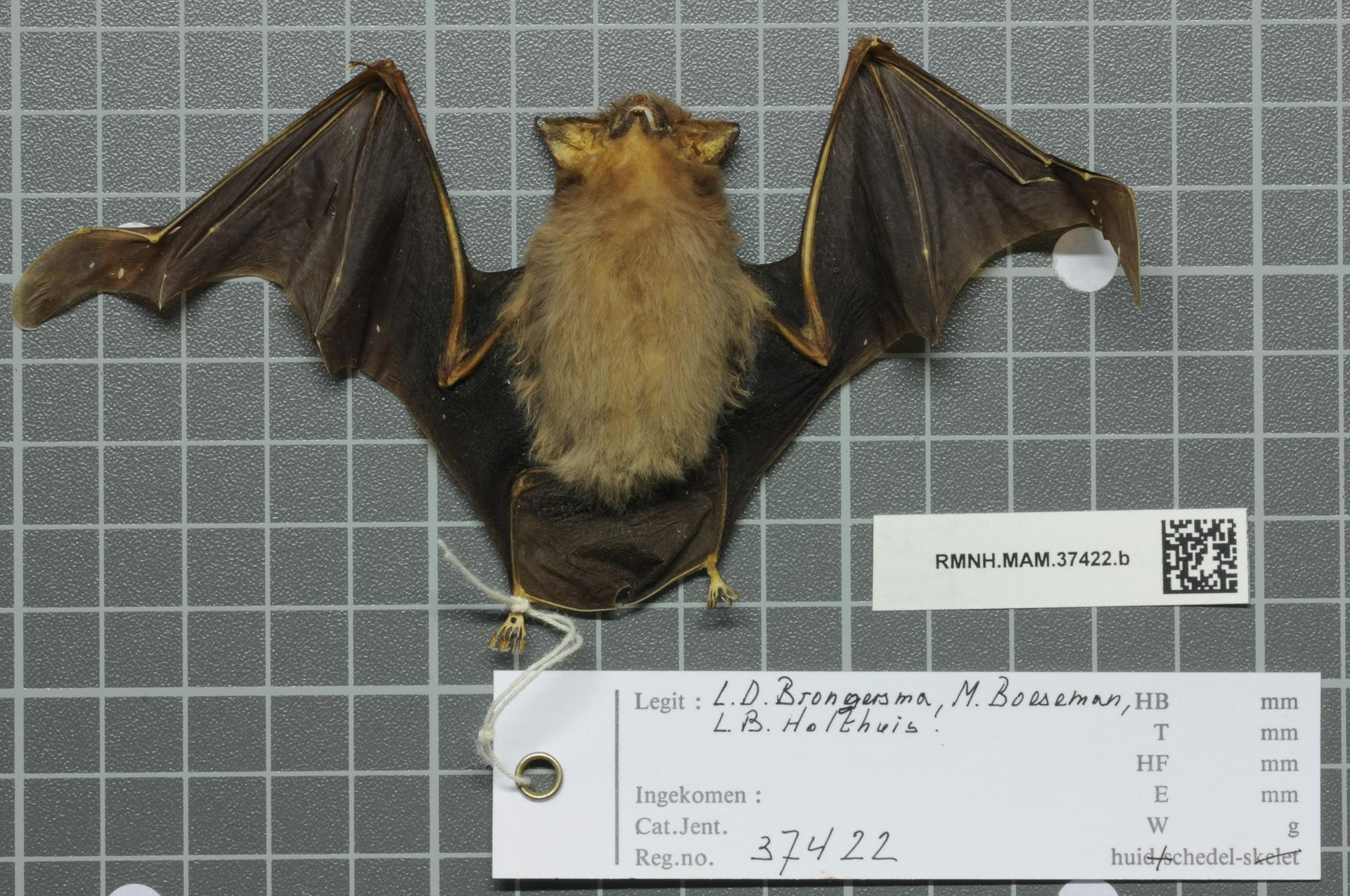

Conservation status
- Least Concern (IUCN 3.1)

Scientific classification
- Kingdom: Animalia
- Phylum: Chordata
- Class: Mammalia
- Order: Chiroptera
- Family: Emballonuridae
- Genus: Emballonura
- Species: E. raffrayana

Binomial name
- Emballonura raffrayana Dobson, 1879
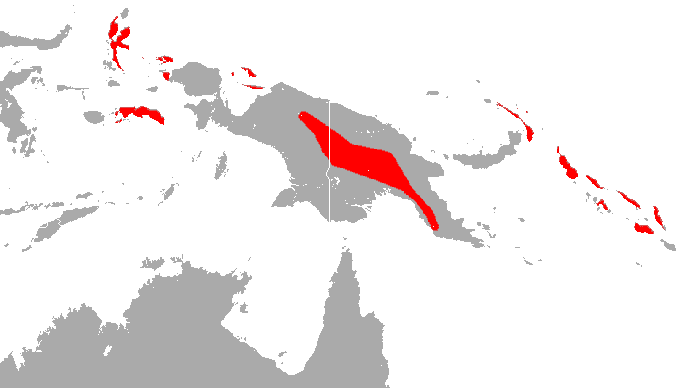
- Raffray's sheath-tailed bat range

= Raffray's sheath-tailed bat =

Species of bat

Raffray's sheath-tailed bat (Emballonura raffrayana) is a species of sac-winged bat in the family Emballonuridae. It is found in eastern Indonesia (including Western New Guinea), Papua New Guinea, and the Solomon Islands.
