= Amazonian sac-winged bat =

Conservation status
- Data Deficient (IUCN 3.1)

Scientific classification
- Kingdom: Animalia
- Phylum: Chordata
- Class: Mammalia
- Order: Chiroptera
- Family: Emballonuridae
- Genus: Saccopteryx
- Species: S. gymnura

Binomial name
- Saccopteryx gymnura Thomas, 1901
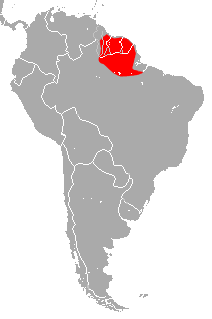
- Amazonian sac-winged bat range

Species of bat

The Amazonian sac-winged bat (Saccopteryx gymnura) is a species of bat in the family Emballonuridae. It is native to South America.

== Taxonomy and etymology ==
It was described as a new species in 1901 by British zoologist Oldfield Thomas. Thomas identified "Mr. Wickham" as the collector of the holotype, possibly referring to British explorer Henry Wickham who also collected bird specimens in South America. Wickham collected the holotype in Santarém along the Amazon River. The species name "gymnura" is from Ancient Greek "gumnós" meaning "naked" and "ourá" meaning "tail." Thomas wrote, "the nakedness of the interfemoral [membrane] will readily distinguish this bat from any of its allies."

== Biology and ecology ==
It is insectivorous, catching its prey in the air and inhabits tropical rainforests. It is found in several countries and territories in northern South America, including Brazil, French Guiana, Guyana, and Suriname. It is uncommonly encountered and its range is not clearly defined.

It is currently evaluated as data deficient by the IUCN.
