= Seri's sheath-tailed bat =

Seri's Sheathtail-bat

Conservation status
- Vulnerable (IUCN 3.1)

Scientific classification
- Kingdom: Animalia
- Phylum: Chordata
- Class: Mammalia
- Order: Chiroptera
- Family: Emballonuridae
- Genus: Emballonura
- Species: E. serii

Binomial name
- Emballonura serii Flannery, 1994
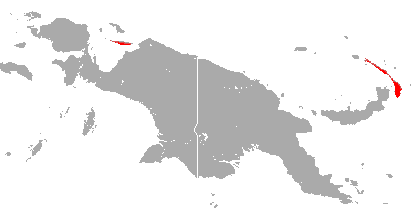
- Seri's sheath-tailed bat range

Species of bat

Seri's sheath-tailed bat (Emballonura serii) is a species of sac-winged bat in the family Emballonuridae. It is found in the Bismarck Archipelago of Papua New Guinea and Yapen Island in Indonesia. It roosts in caves.
