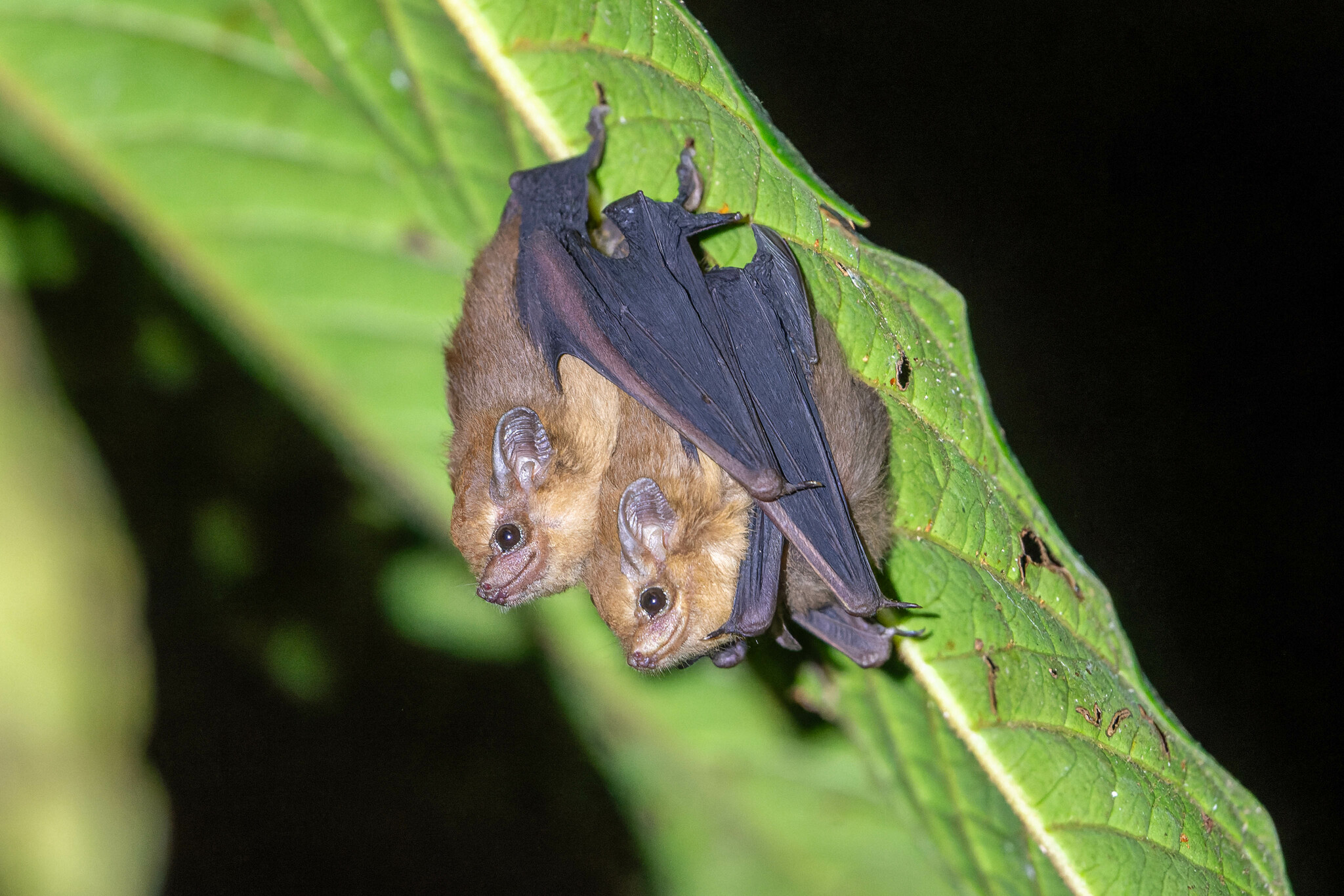

Conservation status
- Least Concern (IUCN 3.1)

Scientific classification
- Kingdom: Animalia
- Phylum: Chordata
- Class: Mammalia
- Order: Chiroptera
- Family: Emballonuridae
- Genus: Mosia; Gray, 1843
- Species: M. nigrescens

Binomial name
- Mosia nigrescens Gray, 1843
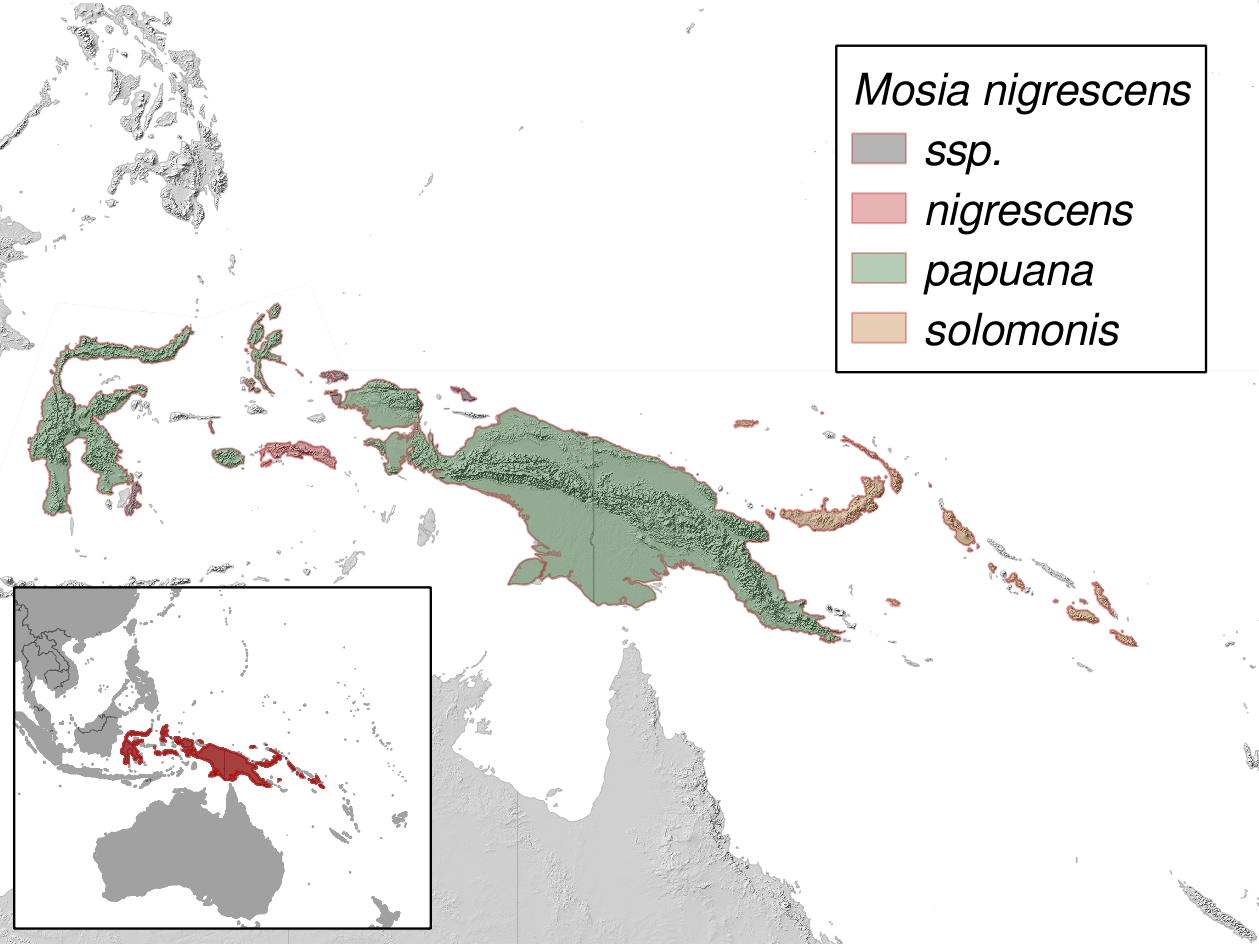
- Dark sheath-tailed bat range

= Dark sheath-tailed bat =

Species of bat

The dark sheath-tailed bat (Mosia nigrescens) is a species of sac-winged bat in the family Emballonuridae. It is the only species in the genus Mosia. It is found in Indonesia, Papua New Guinea, and the Solomon Islands.
