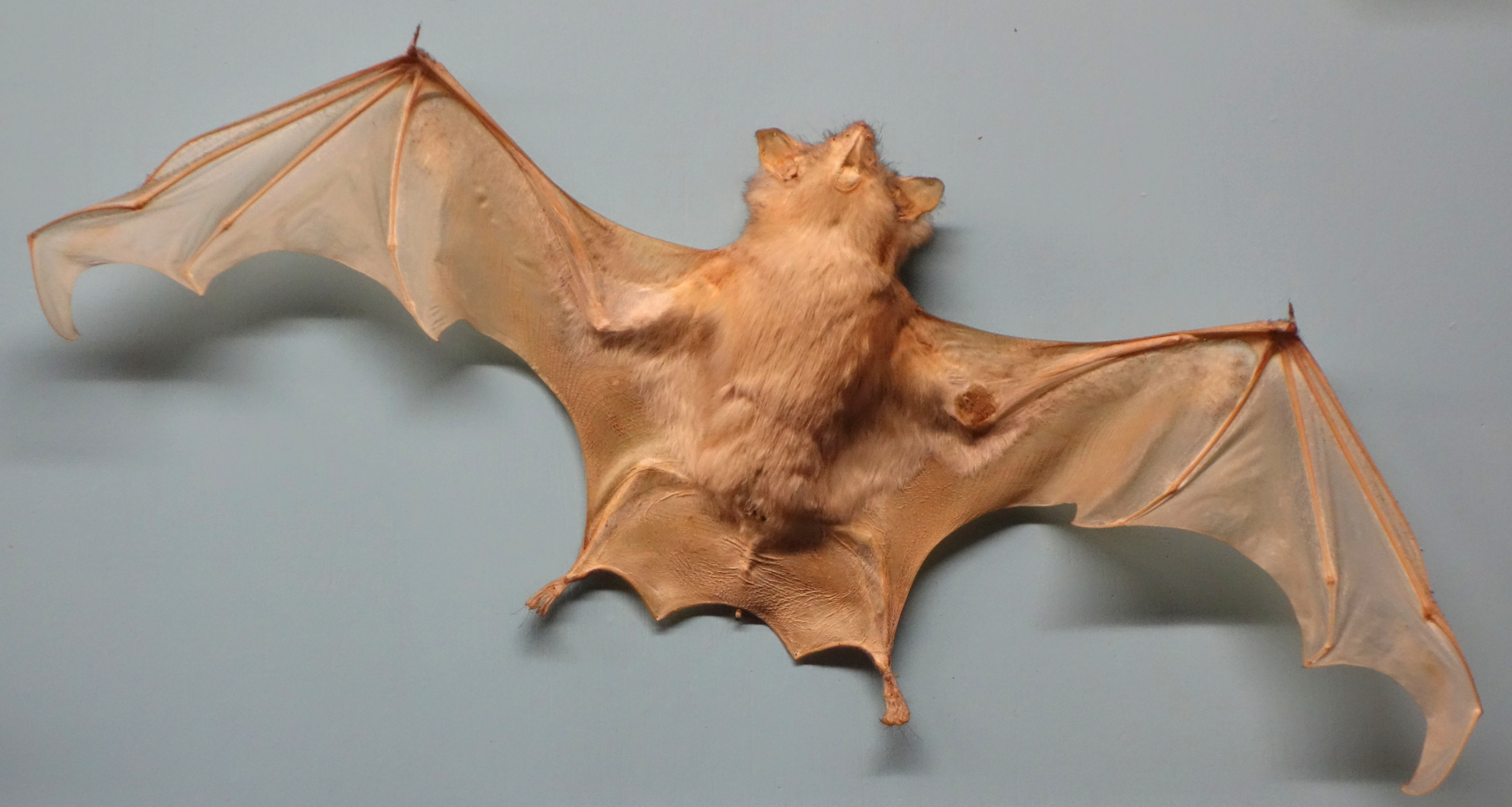

Conservation status
- Least Concern (IUCN 3.1)

Scientific classification
- Kingdom: Animalia
- Phylum: Chordata
- Class: Mammalia
- Order: Chiroptera
- Family: Emballonuridae
- Genus: Taphozous
- Species: T. longimanus

Binomial name
- Taphozous longimanus Hardwicke, 1825
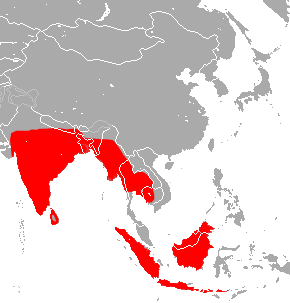
- Long-winged tomb bat range

= Long-winged tomb bat =

Species of bat

The long-winged tomb bat (Taphozous longimanus) is a species of sac-winged bat in the family Emballonuridae. It is found in Bangladesh, Cambodia, India, Indonesia, Malaysia, Myanmar, Singapore, Sri Lanka, and Thailand.
