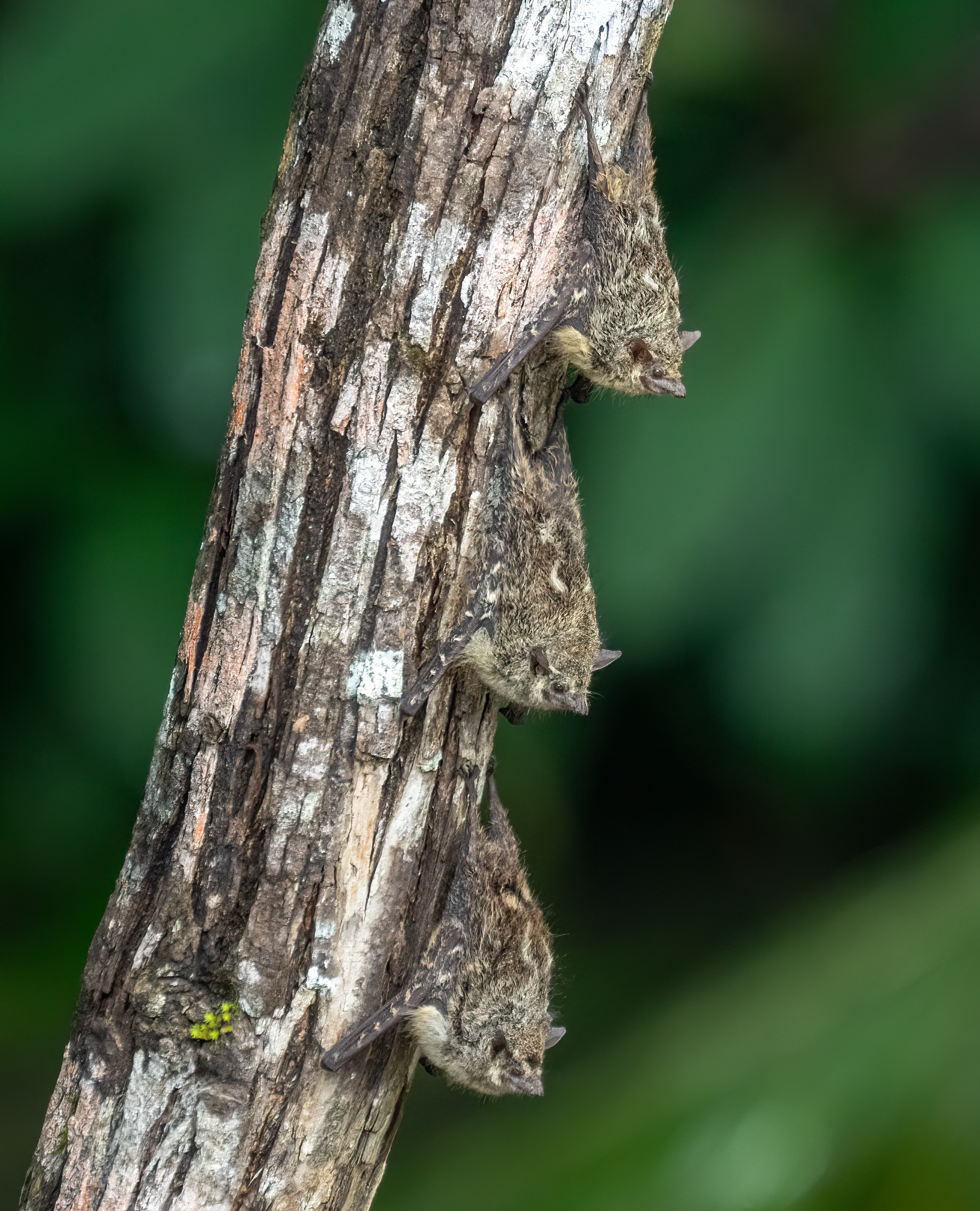
- Proboscis bats

Scientific classification
- Kingdom: Animalia
- Phylum: Chordata
- Class: Mammalia
- Order: Chiroptera
- Superfamily: Emballonuroidea
- Family: Emballonuridae; Gervais in de Castelnau, 1855

Type genus
- Emballonura Temminck, 1838

Genera
- See Text
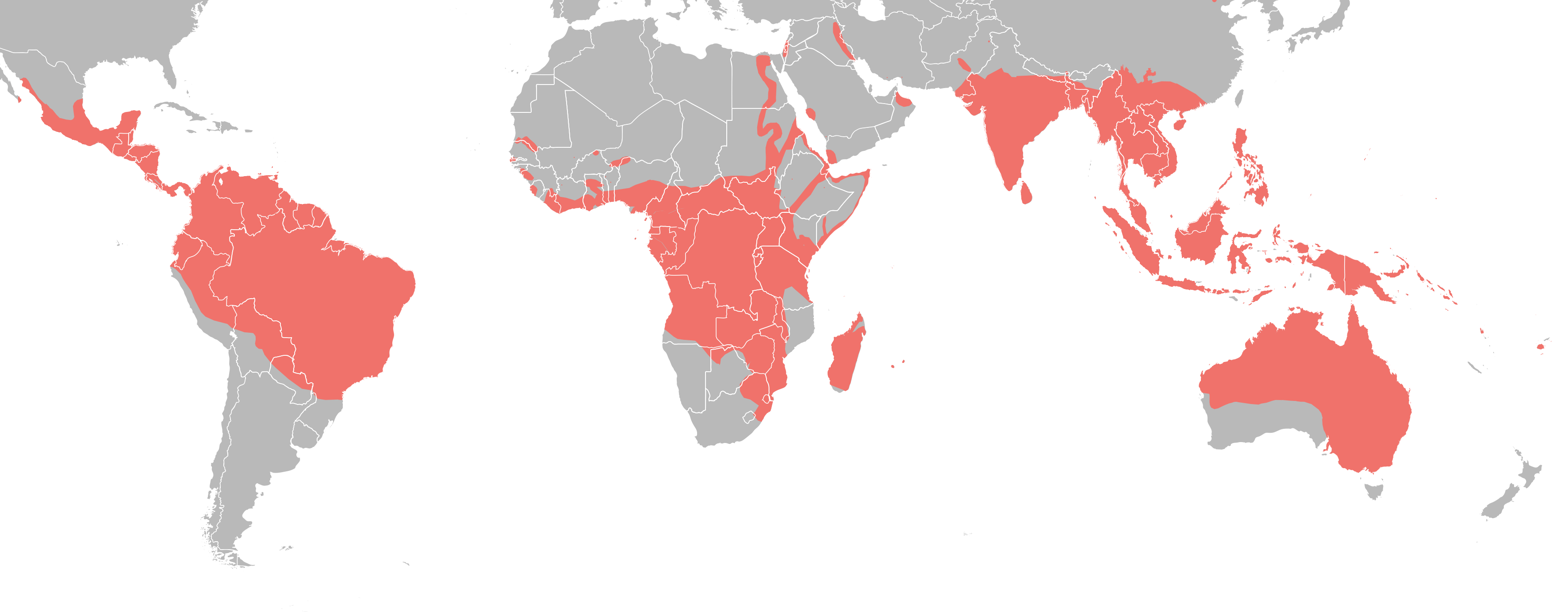
- Emballonuridae distribution

= Emballonuridae =

Family of bats

Emballonuridae is a family of microbats, many of which are referred to as sac-winged or sheath-tailed bats. They are widely distributed in tropical and subtropical regions around the world. The earliest fossil records are from the Eocene.

== Description ==
The emballonurids include some of the smallest of all bats, and range from 3.5 to 10 cm in body length. They are generally brown or grey, although the species of genus Diclidurus are white. The faces are said to be handsome, the heads being comparable to those of domestic dogs, and their wings are long and narrow. As with other microchiropteran families, they use ultrasonic echolocation to sense the surrounding environment and their prey; the signals of some species are unusual in being audible to humans.

Possession of the postorbital processes, the reduced, noncontacting premaxillaries, and rather simple shoulder and elbow joints, which is similar to pteropodids, makes them rather a primitive group. However, they are more advanced in the reduction of the second digit phalanges and the flexion of the third digit proximal phalanges over the metacarpal dorsal side.

The wing surface extends between the legs, a membrane known as a uropatagium, and the structure of these is a characteristic in many of the genera. They have tails which are partially enclosed, a short part of which projects through the uropatagium to form a sheath. The usual arrangement of the uropatagium is as to be fixed to the tail, but the sheathtail feature is joined by an elastic component which allows greater flexibility; they are able to use the hind legs for locomotion and to adjust the membrane's surface while in flight. As a common name indicates, many species also possess sac-shaped glands in their wings (propatagium), which are open to the air and may release pheromones to attract mates. Other species have throat glands which produce strong-smelling secretions. They have the dental formula

Dentition
1-2.1.2.3
2-3.1.2.3

These bats generally prefer to roost in better-illuminated areas than other species of bats. Their dwellings can often be found in hollow trees and entryways to caves or other structures. Some species, such as the genus Taphozous, live in large colonies, but others are solitary. Species living away from the tropics may enter periods of torpor or extended hibernation during colder months.

Emballonurids feed mainly on insects and occasionally on fruit. Most of these bats catch their meals while flying.

The common name for some groups, 'sheath-tailed bats', is sometimes noted as sheathtails.

== Distribution ==
Found in the Neotropics, Afrotropics, southern Asia, Australia and South Pacific islands.

== Classification ==
Family Emballonuridae

- Genus Balantiopteryx
  - Ecuadorian sac-winged bat, Balantiopteryx infusca
  - Thomas's sac-winged bat, Balantiopteryx io
  - Gray sac-winged bat, Balantiopteryx plicata
- Genus Centronycteris
  - Thomas's shaggy bat, Centronycteris centralis
  - Shaggy bat, Centronycteris maximiliani
- Genus Coleura
  - African sheath-tailed bat, Coleura afra
  - Madagascar sheath-tailed bat, Coleura kibomalandy
  - Seychelles sheath-tailed bat, Coleura seychellensis
- Genus Cormura
  - Chestnut sac-winged bat, Cormura brevirostris
- Genus Cyttarops
  - Short-eared bat, Cyttarops alecto
- Genus Diclidurus
  - Northern ghost bat, Diclidurus albus
  - Greater ghost bat, Diclidurus ingens
  - Isabelle's ghost bat, Diclidurus isabella
  - Lesser ghost bat, Diclidurus scutatus
- Genus Emballonura
  - Small Asian sheath-tailed bat, Emballonura alecto
  - Beccari's sheath-tailed bat, Emballonura beccarii
  - Large-eared sheath-tailed bat, Emballonura dianae
  - Greater sheath-tailed bat, Emballonura furax
  - Lesser sheath-tailed bat, Emballonura monticola
  - Raffray's sheath-tailed bat, Emballonura raffrayana
  - Pacific sheath-tailed bat, Emballonura semicaudata
  - Seri's sheath-tailed bat, Emballonura serii
- Genus Mosia
  - Dark sheath-tailed bat, Mosia nigrescens
- Genus Paremballonura
  - Western sheath-tailed bat, Paremballonura tiavato
  - Peters's sheath-tailed bat, Paremballonura atrata
- Genus Peropteryx
  - Greater dog-like bat, Peropteryx kappleri
  - White-winged dog-like bat, Peropteryx leucoptera
  - Lesser dog-like bat, Peropteryx macrotis
  - Pale-winged dog-like bat, Peropteryx pallidoptera
  - Trinidad dog-like bat, Peropteryx trinitatis
- Genus Rhynchonycteris
  - Proboscis bat, Rhynchonycteris naso
- Genus Saccolaimus
  - Yellow-bellied pouched bat, Saccolaimus flaviventris
  - Troughton's pouched bat, Saccolaimus mixtus
  - Pel's pouched bat, Saccolaimus peli
  - Naked-rumped pouched bat, Saccolaimus saccolaimus
- Genus Saccopteryx
  - Antioquian sac-winged bat, Saccopteryx antioquensis
  - Greater sac-winged bat, Saccopteryx bilineata
  - Frosted sac-winged bat, Saccopteryx canescens
  - Amazonian sac-winged bat, Saccopteryx gymnura
  - Lesser sac-winged bat, Saccopteryx leptura
- Genus Taphozous
  - Indonesian tomb bat (Taphozous achates)
  - Coastal sheath-tailed bat (Taphozous australis)
  - Common sheath-tailed bat (Taphozous georgianus)
  - Hamilton's tomb bat (Taphozous hamiltoni)
  - Hildegarde's tomb bat (Taphozous hildegardeae)
  - Hill's sheath-tailed bat (Taphozous hilli)
  - Arnhem sheath-tailed bat (Taphozous kapalgensis)
  - Long-winged tomb bat (Taphozous longimanus)
  - Mauritian tomb bat (Taphozous mauritianus)
  - Black-bearded tomb bat (Taphozous melanopogon)
  - Naked-rumped tomb bat (Taphozous nudiventris)
  - Egyptian tomb bat (Taphozous perforatus)
  - Theobald's tomb bat (Taphozous theobaldi)
  - Troughton's sheath-tailed bat (Taphozous troughtoni)
