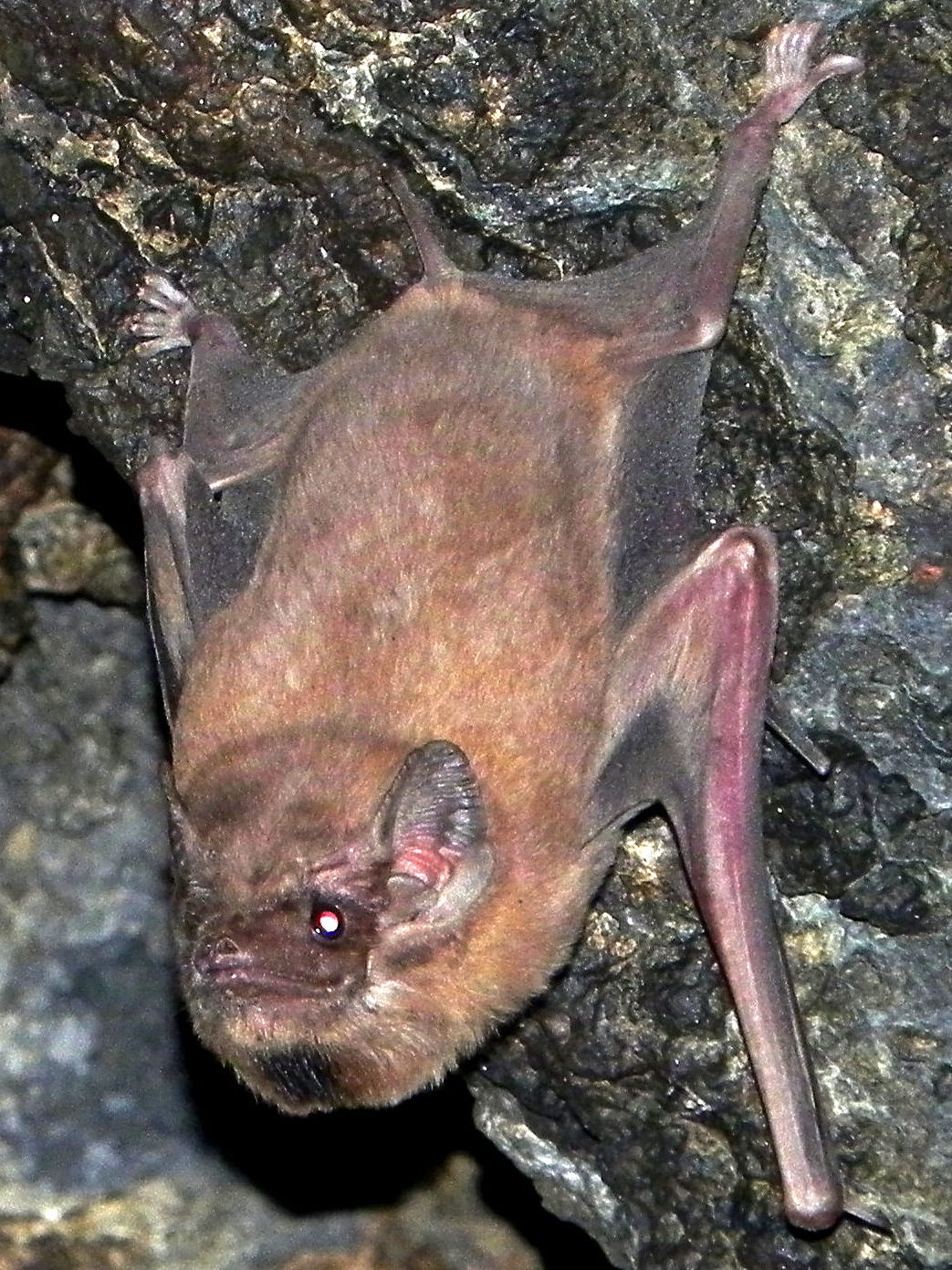
- Black-bearded tomb bat (Taphozous melanopogon)

Scientific classification
- Domain: Eukaryota
- Kingdom: Animalia
- Phylum: Chordata
- Class: Mammalia
- Order: Chiroptera
- Family: Emballonuridae
- Genus: Taphozous; Geoffroy, 1818

Type species
- Taphozous perforatus Geoffroy, 1818

Species
- See text

= Taphozous =

Genus of bats

Taphozous is a genus of the family Emballonuridae. The wide distribution of the genus includes several regions of Australia, Indonesia, Papua New Guinea and Africa. Taphozous comes from the Greek τάφος, meaning "a tomb". The common names for species include variants on sac-winged, sheathtail, or tomb bats.

The genus is the type for a grouping within the family, subfamily Taphozoinae, and an arrangement that describes two subgenera is as follows:

subgenus Taphozous (Liponycteris)

- Hamilton's tomb bat (Taphozous hamiltoni)
- Naked-rumped tomb bat (Taphozous nudiventris)

subgenus Taphozous (Taphozous),

- Indonesian tomb bat (Taphozous achates)
- Coastal sheath-tailed bat (Taphozous australis)
- Common sheath-tailed bat (Taphozous georgianus)
- Hildegarde's tomb bat (Taphozous hildegardeae)
- Hill's sheath-tailed bat (Taphozous hilli)
- Arnhem sheath-tailed bat (Taphozous kapalgensis)
- Long-winged tomb bat (Taphozous longimanus)
- Mauritian tomb bat (Taphozous mauritianus)
- Black-bearded tomb bat (Taphozous melanopogon)
- Egyptian tomb bat (Taphozous perforatus)
- Theobald's tomb bat (Taphozous theobaldi)
- Troughton's sheath-tailed bat (Taphozous troughtoni)

The diversity of some species are recognised as subspecies. Some populations are poorly known, the species Taphozous hilli was not recognised amongst the population of the more common species Taphozous georgianus until 1980.
