= Greater sheath-tailed bat =

Conservation status
- Least Concern (IUCN 3.1)

Scientific classification
- Kingdom: Animalia
- Phylum: Chordata
- Class: Mammalia
- Order: Chiroptera
- Family: Emballonuridae
- Genus: Emballonura
- Species: E. furax

Binomial name
- Emballonura furax Thomas, 1911
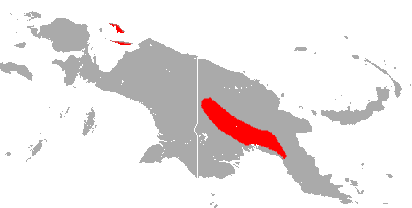
- Greater sheath-tailed bat range

Species of mammal

The greater sheath-tailed bat or New Guinea sheath-tailed bat (Emballonura furax) is a species of sac-winged bat in the family Emballonuridae. It is endemic to New Guinea and some nearby islands.

== Description ==
The New Guinea sheath-tailed bat weighs 10–14 g (0.35–0.49 oz). The head and body lengths of various specimens have been measured at 55–61 mm (2.2–2.4 in)
