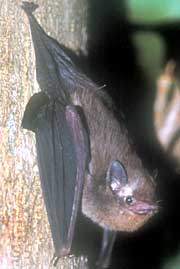
- Pacific sheath-tailed bat (Emballonura semicaudata)

Scientific classification
- Domain: Eukaryota
- Kingdom: Animalia
- Phylum: Chordata
- Class: Mammalia
- Order: Chiroptera
- Family: Emballonuridae
- Genus: Emballonura; Temminck, 1838

Type species
- Emballonura monticola Temminck, 1838

= Emballonura =

Genus of bats

Emballonura (meaning: Erect tail) is a genus of sac-winged bats in the family Emballonuridae. It contains these species:

- Small Asian sheath-tailed bat (E. alecto)
- Beccari's sheath-tailed bat (E. beccarii)
- Large-eared sheath-tailed bat (E. dianae)
- Greater sheath-tailed bat (E. furax)
- Lesser sheath-tailed bat (E. monticola)
- Raffray's sheath-tailed bat (E. raffrayana)
- Pacific sheath-tailed bat (E. semicaudata)
- Seri's sheath-tailed bat (E. serii)
