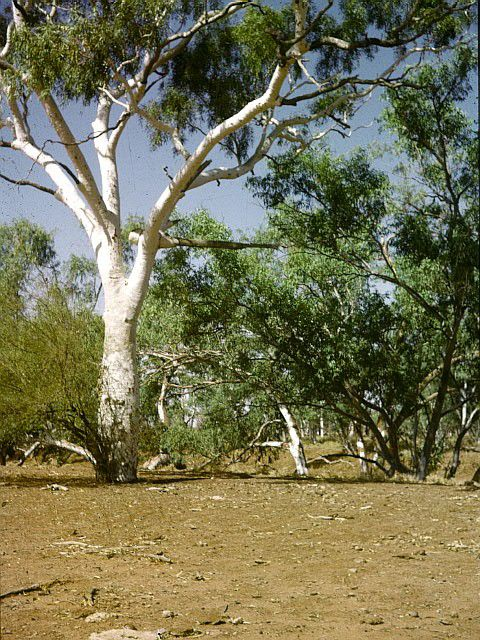

Scientific classification
- Kingdom: Plantae
- Clade: Tracheophytes
- Clade: Angiosperms
- Clade: Eudicots
- Clade: Rosids
- Order: Myrtales
- Family: Myrtaceae
- Genus: Corymbia
- Species: C. papuana

Binomial name
- Corymbia papuana (F.Muell.) K.D.Hill & L.A.S.Johnson

Synonyms
- Corymbia paracolpica K.D.Hill & L.A.S.Johnson; Eucalyptus papuana F.Muell.; Eucalyptus papuana F.Muell. var. papuana

= Corymbia papuana =

Species of plant

Corymbia papuana, commonly known as ghost gum, is a species of evergreen tree native to New Guinea, some Torres Strait Islands and the northern part of the Cape York Peninsula in Australia. It has smooth whitish bark, lance-shaped adult leaves, flower buds in groups of three or seven, creamy white flowers and barrel-shaped or urn-shaped fruit.

== Description ==
Corymbia papuana is a tree that typically grows to a height of 40 m (130 ft) and forms a lignotuber. It has smooth white, creamy white or pale grey bark. Young plants and coppice regrowth have hairy, elliptic to egg-shaped or lance-shaped leaves that are 50–190 mm (2.0–7.5 in) long and 22–110 mm (0.87–4.33 in) wide on a short petiole. Adult leaves are arranged alternately, the same shade of dull green on both sides, lance-shaped, 90–210 mm (3.5–8.3 in) long and 16–35 mm (0.63–1.38 in) wide on a petiole 7–25 mm (0.28–0.98 in) long. The flower buds are arranged in leaf axils on a branched peduncle 2–10 mm (0.079–0.394 in) long, each branch of the peduncle with three or seven buds on pedicels 2–10 mm (0.079–0.394 in) long. Mature buds are pear-shaped, 5–6 mm (0.20–0.24 in) long and 4–5 mm (0.16–0.20 in) wide with a rounded operculum that sometimes has a small point in the centre. Flowering has been observed in October and November and the flowers are creamy white and perfumed. The fruit is a woody barrel-shaped or urn-shaped capsule 6–12 mm (0.24–0.47 in) long and 6–8 mm (0.24–0.31 in) wide with the valves enclosed in the fruit.

== Taxonomy and naming ==
This eucalypt was first formally described in 1875 by Ferdinand von Mueller who gave it the name Eucalyptus papuana. The description was published in von Mueller's book Descriptive notes on Papuan plants from specimens collected "[on] the mainland of new Guines opposite to Yule-Island, about twelve miles [19 km]) distant from the shores." In 1995, Ken Hill and Lawrie Johnson changed the name to Corymbia papuana.

== Distribution and habitat ==
Corymbia papuana grows in grassy woodland usually on flats, but sometimes on stony hillsides. Hill and Johnson described the species as "endemic in southern parts of the island of New Guinea". Other authors include some Torres Strait Islands and northern parts of the Cape York Peninsula in the distribution.
