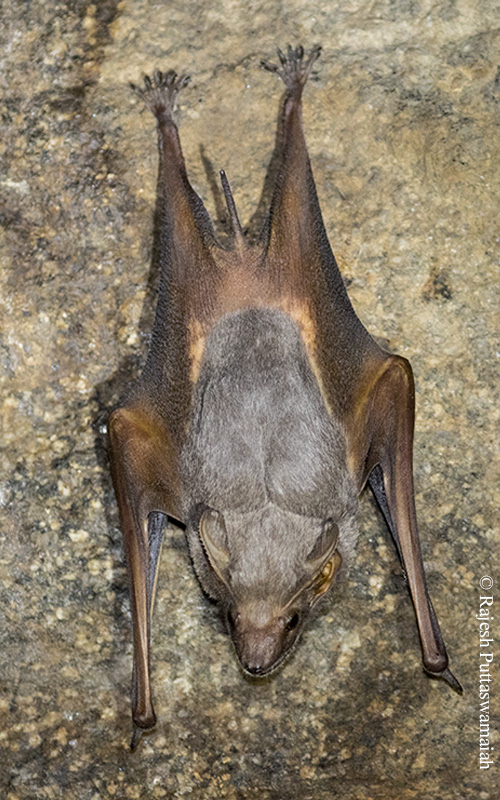

Conservation status
- Least Concern (IUCN 3.1)

Scientific classification
- Kingdom: Animalia
- Phylum: Chordata
- Class: Mammalia
- Order: Chiroptera
- Family: Emballonuridae
- Genus: Taphozous
- Species: T. theobaldi

Binomial name
- Taphozous theobaldi Dobson, 1872
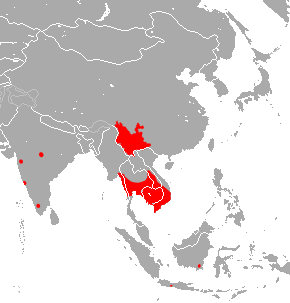
- Theobald's Tomb Bat range

= Theobald's tomb bat =

Species of bat

Theobald's tomb bat (Taphozous theobaldi) is a species of sac-winged bat in the family Emballonuridae. It is found in India, Indonesia, Myanmar, Thailand, and Vietnam.
