= Naked-rumped tomb bat =

Conservation status
- Least Concern (IUCN 3.1)

Scientific classification
- Kingdom: Animalia
- Phylum: Chordata
- Class: Mammalia
- Order: Chiroptera
- Family: Emballonuridae
- Genus: Taphozous
- Species: T. nudiventris

Binomial name
- Taphozous nudiventris Cretzschmar, 1830
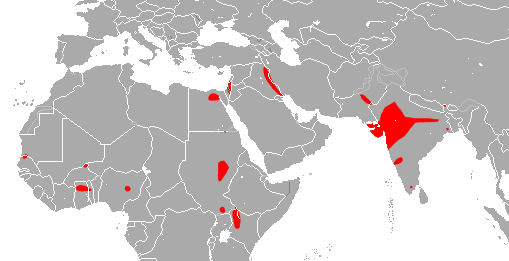
- Naked-rumped tomb bat range

Species of bat

The naked-rumped tomb bat (Taphozous nudiventris) is a species of sac-winged bat in the family Emballonuridae. Found in northern Africa, the Middle East, and southeastern Asia, its natural habitats are dry savanna, subtropical or tropical dry shrubland and forests, caves, and arid areas.

== Description ==
The naked-rumped tomb bat is a moderate-sized, sac-winged bat, males typically being slightly larger than females. The head is fairly flat with a long, cone-shaped snout and a shallow depression between the large eyes. The lower lip has a grooved protuberance and the ears are triangular and backward-pointing. There is no nose-leaf and the throat pouches are well-developed in the male but less so in the female. The fur is short and sleek, and covers the whole body apart from the rump, lower belly and hind limbs; there is a sharp division between the furred and naked parts, with about one third of the total surface lacking hair. The dorsal pelage is pale greyish-brown, deep brown or rusty-brown and the ventral pelage is a paler colour than the back. The wing membrane is dark brown and the tail projects freely from the upper surface of the interfemoral membrane.

== Distribution and habitat ==
This bat is widely distributed across northern Africa and western Asia. Its range extends from Morocco and sub-Saharan Africa through Egypt and the Middle East to Pakistan and India. It is found in semi-arid and arid areas as well as tropical forests; wherever there is a combination of open areas in which to hunt and suitable roosting sites in rocky or underground locations. It is often associated with human settlements, but is not tolerant of much disturbance at its roosting sites.

== Ecology ==
The naked-rumped tomb bat is agile, flying fast and high in open areas, hawking for insects. It is a social species, becoming active about half an hour before the sun sets, and streaming from the daytime roost shortly after sunset. Its diet includes beetles, moths, grasshoppers, crickets, cockroaches and flying ants. It roosts gregariously in crevices between stones, in caves, crags, ruins and old buildings. In Egypt, it roosts in the Karnak Temple Complex, alongside several other species of bat, each in its own location. In Iraq and Pakistan it makes annual migrations, roosting in cool caves and buildings and laying down fat reserves in summer, and relocating to warmer buildings in winter, where it may enter a state of torpor.

For most of the year, males and females roost together, but the males move to roost elsewhere before the young are born. For the first few weeks, the new-born bat clings to its mother while she flies, but later, the young roost beside their mothers, remaining behind while their mothers forage. Even when they start foraging on the wing themselves, the young accompany their parent. The gestation period is nine weeks, but the female may store the sperm during hibernation, with fertilisation and pregnancy occurring in the spring. The bats are preyed on by owls and hawks, the latter sometimes picking them off as they leave their daytime roost.

== Status ==
The naked-rumped tomb bat has a very wide range across northern and Central Africa, the Middle East and southern Asia. It is uncommon in western Africa where it usually occurs in small groups, but more plentiful, with large colonies, in eastern Africa. It is also common in southern Asia, but altogether its numbers seem to be declining. It is tolerant of some level of disturbance by humans in its habitat, but some populations may be adversely affected by the use of pesticides. It faces few threats, and the International Union for Conservation of Nature has assessed its conservation status as being of "least concern".
