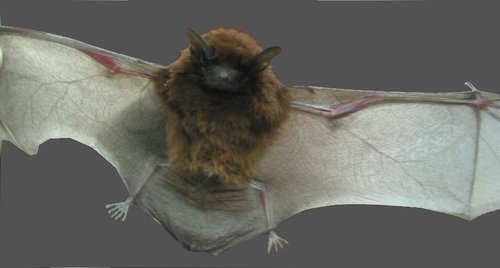

Conservation status
- Data Deficient (IUCN 3.1)

Scientific classification
- Kingdom: Animalia
- Phylum: Chordata
- Class: Mammalia
- Order: Chiroptera
- Family: Emballonuridae
- Genus: Peropteryx
- Species: P. pallidoptera

Binomial name
- Peropteryx pallidoptera Lim, Engstrom, Reid, Simmons, Voss & Fleck, 2010
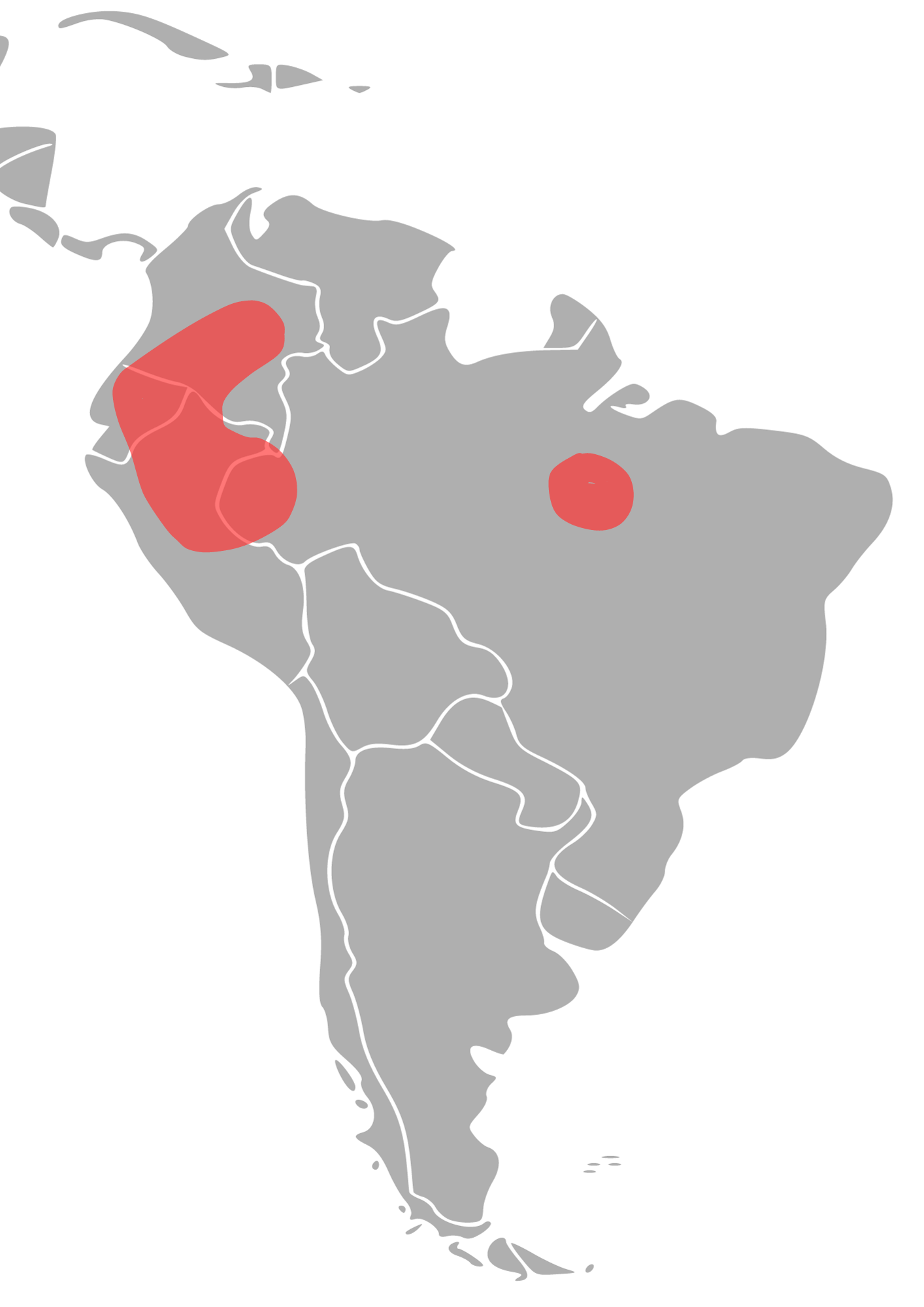

= Pale-winged dog-like bat =

Species of bat

The pale-winged dog-like bat (Peropteryx pallidoptera) is a bat species found in Brazil, Colombia, Ecuador, and Peru.
