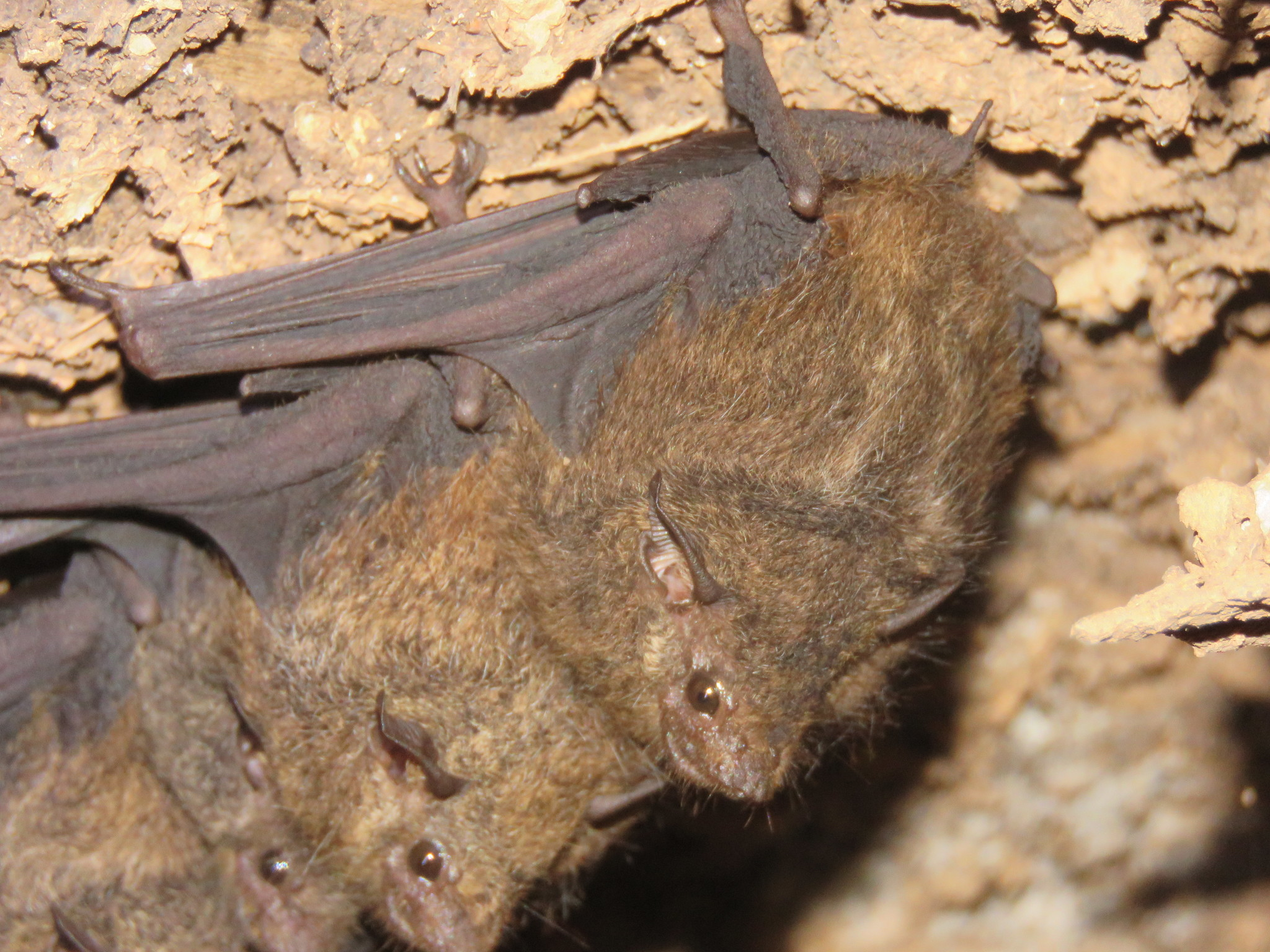

Conservation status
- Least Concern (IUCN 3.1)

Scientific classification
- Kingdom: Animalia
- Phylum: Chordata
- Class: Mammalia
- Order: Chiroptera
- Family: Emballonuridae
- Genus: Saccopteryx
- Species: S. canescens

Binomial name
- Saccopteryx canescens Thomas, 1901
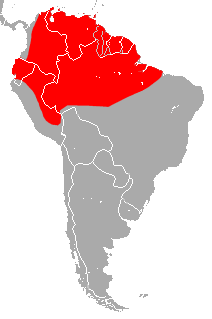
- Frosted sac-winged bat range

= Frosted sac-winged bat =

Species of bat

The frosted sac-winged bat (Saccopteryx canescens) is a bat species of the family Emballonuridae found in northern Brazil, Colombia, Ecuador, French Guiana, Guyana, Peru, Suriname, Venezuela and possibly Bolivia.
