= Large-eared sheath-tailed bat =

Conservation status
- Least Concern (IUCN 3.1)

Scientific classification
- Kingdom: Animalia
- Phylum: Chordata
- Class: Mammalia
- Order: Chiroptera
- Family: Emballonuridae
- Genus: Emballonura
- Species: E. dianae

Binomial name
- Emballonura dianae Hill, 1956
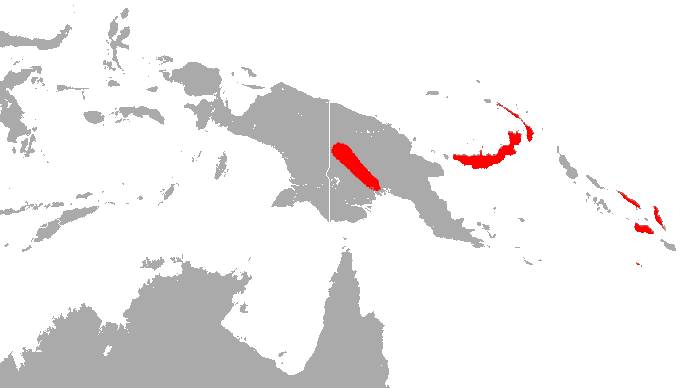
- Large-eared sheath-tailed bat range

Species of bat

The large-eared sheath-tailed bat (Emballonura dianae) is a species of sac-winged bat in the family Emballonuridae. It is found in Papua New Guinea and the Solomon Islands.
