= Indonesian tomb bat =

Conservation status
- Data Deficient (IUCN 3.1)

Scientific classification
- Kingdom: Animalia
- Phylum: Chordata
- Class: Mammalia
- Order: Chiroptera
- Family: Emballonuridae
- Genus: Taphozous
- Species: T. achates

Binomial name
- Taphozous achates Thomas, 1915
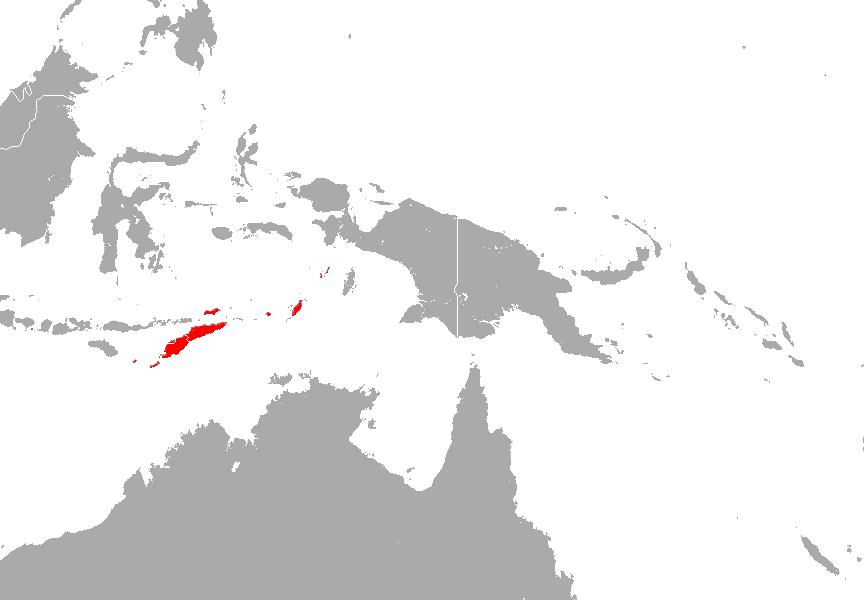
- Indonesian tomb bat range

Species of bat

The Indonesian tomb bat (Taphozous achates) is a species of sac-winged bat in the family Emballonuridae. It is found only in Indonesia.

== Taxonomy ==
The Indonesian tomb bat was described as a new species in 1915 by British mammalogist Oldfield Thomas. The holotype had been collected on the Indonesian island of Savu in 1896 by British naturalist Alfred Hart Everett. The inspiration for the species name "achates" is the character of Achates from a Latin epic poem, The Aeneid. Oldfield Thomas frequently employed names from mythology and the Classics when naming new species of mammal.

== Description ==
In many characteristics, it is similar to the black-bearded tomb bat, though it can be differentiated by its conspicuously larger skull. Individuals have a forearm length of approximately 62 mm (2.4 in).
