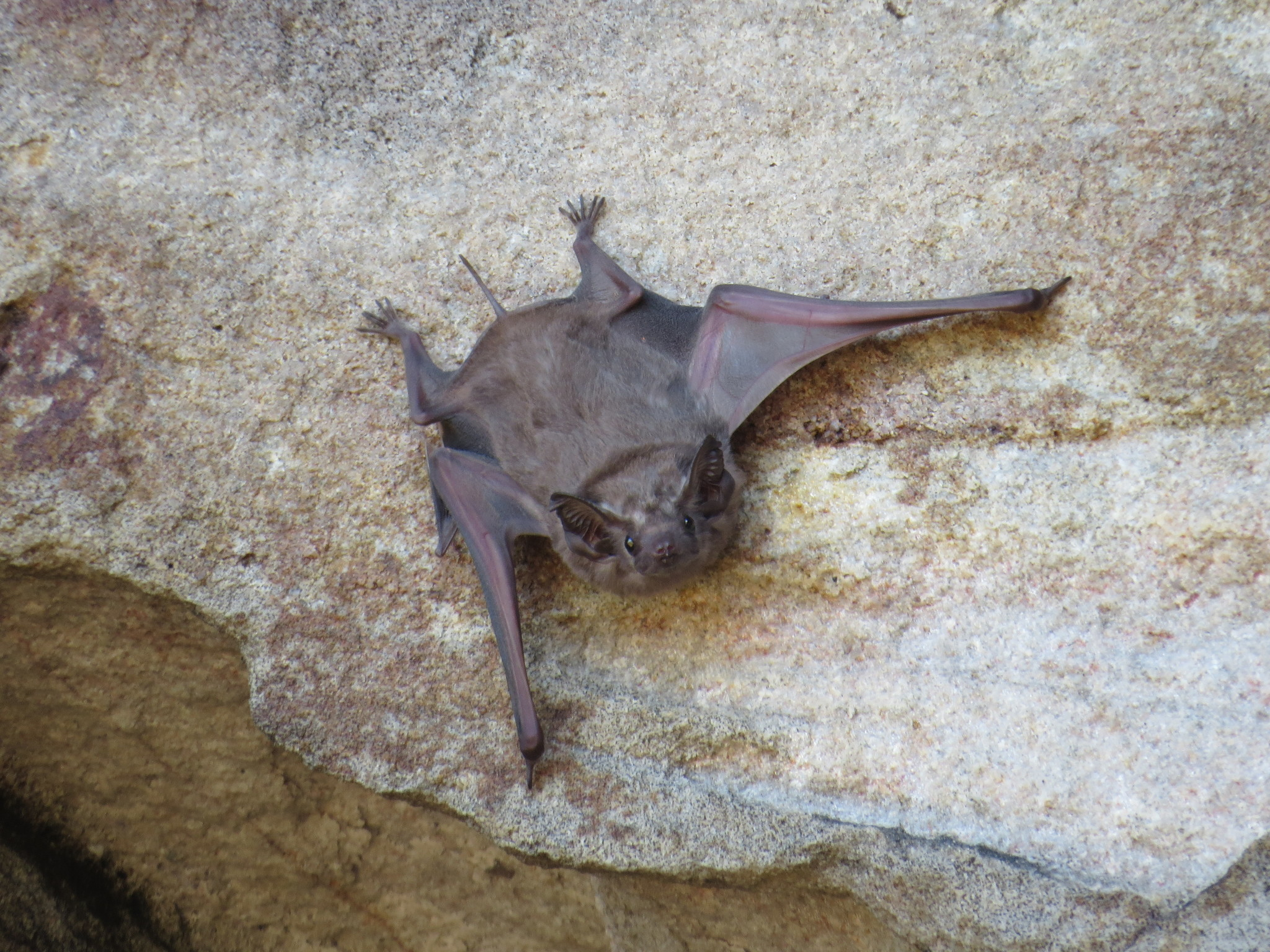
- Near Mackay, Queensland, Australia

Conservation status
- Near Threatened (IUCN 3.1)

Scientific classification
- Kingdom: Animalia
- Phylum: Chordata
- Class: Mammalia
- Order: Chiroptera
- Family: Emballonuridae
- Genus: Taphozous
- Species: T. australis

Binomial name
- Taphozous australis Gould, 1854
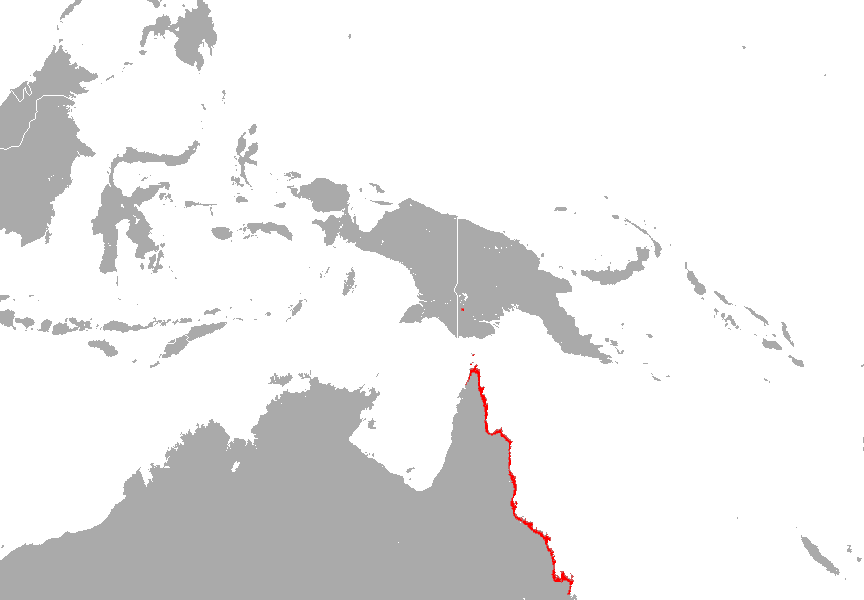
- Coastal sheath-tailed bat range

= Coastal sheath-tailed bat =

Species of bat

The coastal sheath-tailed bat (Taphozous australis), or coastal tomb bat, is a species of sheath-tailed bat in the family Emballonuridae. It is found in Australia and Papua New Guinea.
