= Hamilton's tomb bat =

Conservation status
- Data Deficient (IUCN 3.1)

Scientific classification
- Kingdom: Animalia
- Phylum: Chordata
- Class: Mammalia
- Order: Chiroptera
- Family: Emballonuridae
- Genus: Taphozous
- Species: T. hamiltoni

Binomial name
- Taphozous hamiltoni Thomas, 1920
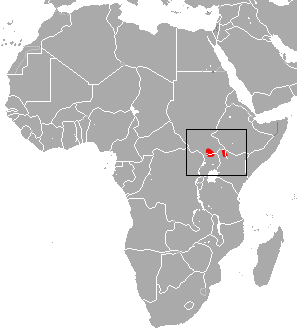
- Hamilton's tomb bat range

Species of bat

Hamilton's tomb bat (Taphozous hamiltoni) is a species of sac-winged bat in the family Emballonuridae. It is found in Chad, Kenya, Somalia, South Sudan, Tanzania, and Uganda. Its natural habitat is savanna.
