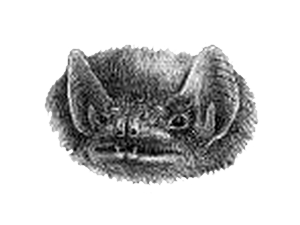

Scientific classification
- Domain: Eukaryota
- Kingdom: Animalia
- Phylum: Chordata
- Class: Mammalia
- Order: Chiroptera
- Family: Emballonuridae
- Genus: Coleura; Peters, 1867

Type species
- Emballonura afra Peters, 1852

Species
- Coleura afra Coleura seychellensis

= Coleura =

Genus of bats

Coleura is a genus of sac-winged bats in the family Emballonuridae. It contains four species:

- African sheath-tailed bat (C. afra)
- Coleura gallarum
- Madagascar sheath-tailed bat (C. kibomalandy)
- Seychelles sheath-tailed bat (C. seychellensis)
