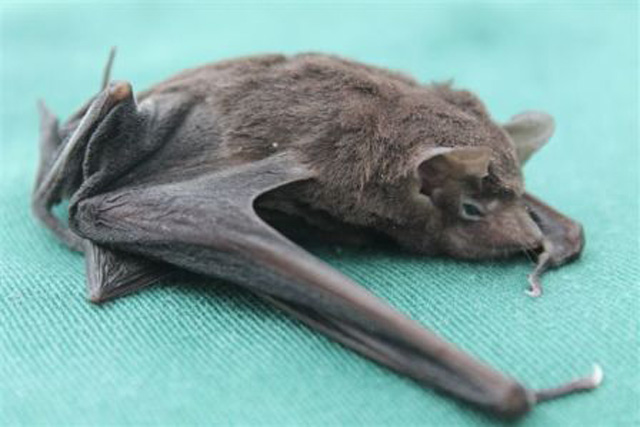
- A dead Seychelles sheath-tailed bat collected for research

Conservation status
- Critically Endangered (IUCN 3.1)

Scientific classification
- Kingdom: Animalia
- Phylum: Chordata
- Class: Mammalia
- Order: Chiroptera
- Family: Emballonuridae
- Genus: Coleura
- Species: C. seychellensis

Binomial name
- Coleura seychellensis (Peters, 1868)
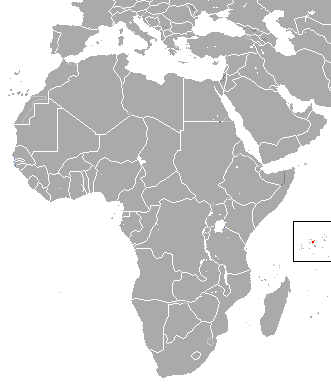
- Seychelles sheath-tailed bat range

= Seychelles sheath-tailed bat =

Species of bat

The Seychelles sheath-tailed bat (Coleura seychellensis) is a sac-winged bat found in the central granitic islands of the Seychelles. They are nocturnal insectivores that roost communally in caves. The species was previously abundant across much of the archipelago, but has since seen a substantial loss of habitat. The International Union for Conservation of Nature has listed the species as being critically endangered, due to population decline. This is mainly due to an increase in land development and the introduction of invasive species.

== Ecology ==
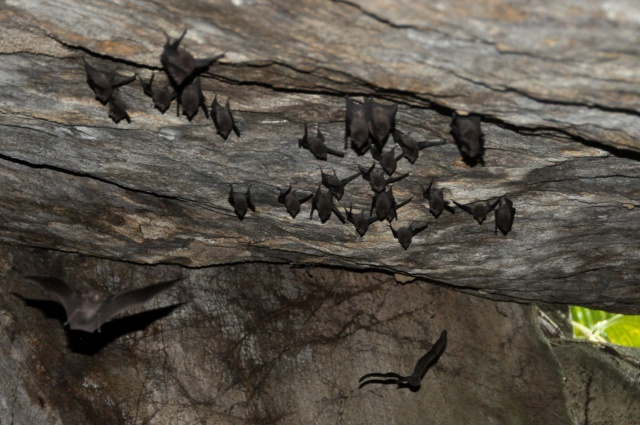
Seychelles sheath-tailed bat in a cave

The weight of Seychelles sheath-tailed bats averages about 10–11 grams (0.35–0.39 oz). Bats in this genus generally roost in caves and houses, in crevices and cracks. In the 1860s, the Seychelles sheath-tailed bat was reported to fly around clumps of bamboo towards twilight, and in the daytime to be found roosting in the clefts of the mountainside facing the sea and with a more or less northern aspect. These hiding places were generally covered over with the large fronds of endemic palms. The Seychelles sheath-tailed bat is insectivorous. It feeds predominantly on marsh-associated Ceratopogonidae, in contrast to Curlionidae in palm woodland. Its colonies are apparently divided into harem groups.

It has been the focus of recent intensive research, which has determined that it is a species associated with small clearings in forests where it feeds on a wide variety of insect species. Observations of coastal or marsh feeding are thought to be bats that have been forced into feeding in unusual situations due to habitat deterioration. Although the species is not a specialist and has a high reproductive potential, it is very vulnerable to disturbance and requires several roost sites within healthy habitat.

== Status ==
It was probably abundant throughout the Seychelles in the past, but it has declined drastically and is now extinct on most islands. The International Union for Conservation of Nature lists this bat as being critically endangered. In 2013, Bat Conservation International listed this species as one of the 35 species of its worldwide priority list of conservation.

It is one of the most endangered animals, fewer than 100 are believed to exist in the world. The Seychelles sheath-tailed bat has suffered from habitat deterioration due to the effects of cultivation of coconut plantations and the introduction of the kudzu vine, both of which have reduced the incidence of scrub and the availability of insect prey. The largest surviving roost is on Silhouette Island, although small roosts do exist in Mahé and also Praslin and La Digue islands. Its lifespan is 20 years; its length is 55–65 mm (2.2–2.6 in). It finds its mates by fighting with another male bat in front of the females.

== Echolocation ==
Echolocation in bats is the combination of producing sound waves via a bat's vocalization, using echoes from an environment, and highly evolved ears in bats. These sound waves are projected from an origin (the individual bat) until they come upon an object and are promptly bounced back to the origin at a lesser frequency and received by the source individual. The variation in the return frequency can then be used by the individual to make a "visual" map of the environment in order for the bat to find their food or perform other tasks such as navigation as well as just communicating with other individuals in the colony. There are a few different and important variables that can affect acoustic signals and soundwaves, first of which includes time/length (temporal character) of the calls by an individual. Temporal control can be important in perceptual organization of echoes as they are returning back to a source individual from various directions and distances. A second variable is speed/rate (spectral character) at which an individual calls and is important in helping an individual to perceptually visualize their surroundings when they are flying through terrain. The speed (frequency) that an individual calls also can become faster as they close the distance between themselves and a food source, which is how they hunt flying insects such as Lepidoptera. The speed at which calls can be adjusted from an individual also is important to keep track of each echo in more complex audio terrain.

In order to use echolocation effectively bats have gone through much evolution to specialize in this method of movement and hunting. The two evolutionary pathways of echolocation in the two current suborders of bats, Yinpterochiroptera and Yangochiroptera are first, that echolocation has evolved separately between the two suborders, and second, that echolocation evolved from a single point in bat ancestral history and later was lost in some, but not all, Yinpterochiroptera suborder species. There are two different structures that can be utilized for the inner ear of bats, the wall-less canal or the fenestral canal. The wall-less canal allows for ganglion axons to cluster together without restrictions and allows for more space for more neurons. The fenestral canal is more restrictive and does not allow for the increase of space for more neurons and also does not allow the clustering of ganglion axons which makes this structure more restrictive when concerning the variation of ganglion. The highly derived spiral ganglion structure of the inner ear in Yangochiroptera, the suborder of Coleura seychellensis, is referred to as a trans-otic ganglion with a wall-less Rosenthal canal and is what makes echolocation work so well in bats of a similar evolutionary pathway.

== Vocalization ==
Within echolocation, there is vocalization which can be best described as how a frequency is altered for different purposes and needs. At a family level (Emballonuridae) four call structures have been described, broadband FM (Frequency modulation), narrowband FM, long multi-harmonic calls and short multi-harmonic calls. Broadband FM is simply an FM sweep, narrowband FM is a downwards FM sweep that is then followed by a more narrow band tail. Long multi-harmonic calls are calls that have a minimum of 4 narrowband FM harmonics in a 2 ms period. Similarly, short multi-harmonic calls are ones that also have 4 narrowband FM harmonics but in under 2 ms. The structure of calls can be altered for a specific need, they can be faster, slower, louder, or quieter from a source individual depending if they are hunting, navigating, communicating, protecting territory, or courting a mate. To date, there are 21 simple syllables and 62 composite syllables in Saccopteryx bilineata males which are in the same family, Emballonuridae, as Coleura seychellensis.

Using these syllables there are seven vocalization types in the species S. bilineata, identified as pulses, barks, chatter, whistles, screeches, territorial songs, and courtship songs. Pulses have a CF (constant frequency), start with an upward FM hook, end with a downward FM hook, and last about 7.4 ms. Barks are similar to pulses but are longer at about 10.5 ms and mainly come from males. Chatter calls are in sequences of up to 50 calls in about 5.5 ms, a single chatter call can resemble pulses but usually has a higher degree of FM. Whistles are very loud and tonal vocalizations by males hovering in front of females and last about 66.7 ms, start with an FM upstroke, increasing in fundamental frequency, and end with an FM downstroke. At the same time females vocalize a screech that can last up to 300 ms and are related to territorial conflicts and response to males hovering, these calls, also vocalized by males, typically have a duration of about 97 ms.

Territorial songs are the most noticeable vocalizations in a colony with 10-50 tonal calls that first have an upward FM, then a V-shaped call in the middle, ending with a lower fundamental frequency that is headed by a noisy buzz. The territorial calls can last anywhere from 10 ms to 100 ms and their structure can vary throughout the day. Complex songs in mammals are rare and uncommon in S. bilineata but are used as courtship songs by males. The complex courtship songs also allow for individual identification of males by females in the species S. bilineata. These courtship calls will only happen after territorial calls are finished in the morning and before territorial calls start in the evening and require ultrasound recording systems because they are above 20 kHz, that is, out of human hearing range (About 20 Hz - 20 kHz). These courtship songs also can last for up to 1 hour while being directed at a single female. As mentioned, S. bilineata are in the same family as C. seychellensis and while there is not as much known for C. seychellensis, 4 types of calls have been categorized specifically for C. seychellensis: complex calls, orientation calls, orientation calls in open areas, and foraging calls.

Complex social calls have a wide frequency range and are mainly directed at other bats with no repetition in call structure. Orientation calls are used for orientation in various terrains, usually in confined spaces. Orientation calls in open areas involve no changes in frequency or amplitude. Last, foraging calls are similar to orientation calls in open areas but include two alternating CF pulses. Lower frequencies are usually used for navigation in C. seychellensis while higher frequencies are used for prey detection when an individual is in a more clustered environment.
