= Small Asian sheath-tailed bat =

Conservation status
- Least Concern (IUCN 3.1)

Scientific classification
- Kingdom: Animalia
- Phylum: Chordata
- Class: Mammalia
- Infraclass: Placentalia
- Order: Chiroptera
- Family: Emballonuridae
- Genus: Emballonura
- Species: E. alecto

Binomial name
- Emballonura alecto (Eydoux and Gervais, 1836)
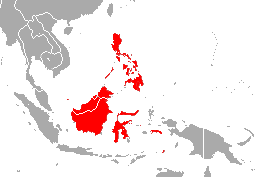
- Small Asian sheath-tailed bat range

Synonyms
- Vespertilio alecto Eydoux and Gervais, 1836

Species of mammal

The small Asian sheath-tailed bat (Emballonura alecto) is a species of sac-winged bat in the family Emballonuridae. It is found in Borneo, Sulawesi, and the Philippines.

== Habitat ==
Roosting sites for the Small Asian sheath-tailed bat have been identified in various locations, including caves, man-made tunnels, and shallow areas beneath rocks, overhangs, and crevices.
