= Beccari's sheath-tailed bat =

Conservation status
- Least Concern (IUCN 3.1)

Scientific classification
- Kingdom: Animalia
- Phylum: Chordata
- Class: Mammalia
- Order: Chiroptera
- Family: Emballonuridae
- Genus: Emballonura
- Species: E. beccarii

Binomial name
- Emballonura beccarii Peters and Doria, 1881
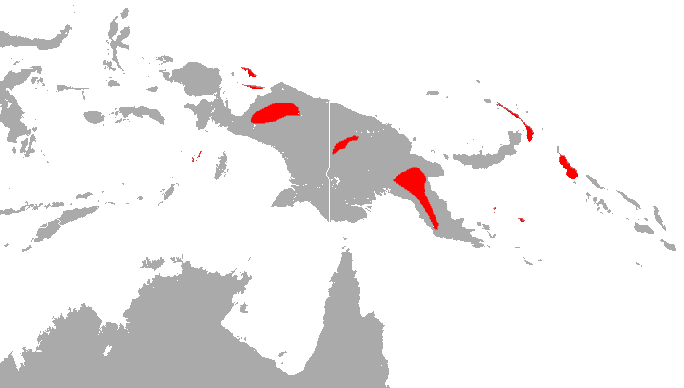
- Beccari's sheath-tailed bat range

Synonyms
- Emballonura locusta Thomas, 1920

Species of bat

Beccari's sheath-tailed bat (Emballonura beccarii) is a species of sac-winged bat in the family Emballonuridae. It is found in New Guinea and in some nearby islands in both Indonesia and Papua New Guinea.

== Taxonomy ==
It was described as a new species in 1881 by German naturalist Wilhelm Peters and Italian naturalist Giacomo Doria. The eponym for the species name "beccari" is Odoardo Beccari, an Italian botanist who conducted a zoological research expedition on the island of New Guinea where the bat was first documented.

== Biology ==
It is nocturnal, roosting in sheltered places such as caves during the day. At night, it forages for its prey—insects—along forest streams, in dense forests, and in clearings. Its range includes several islands of Indonesia and Papua New Guinea. It has been documented from 0–1,500 m (0–4,921 ft) above sea level.

It is currently evaluated as least concern by the IUCN. Some populations may be threatened by overharvesting for bushmeat.
