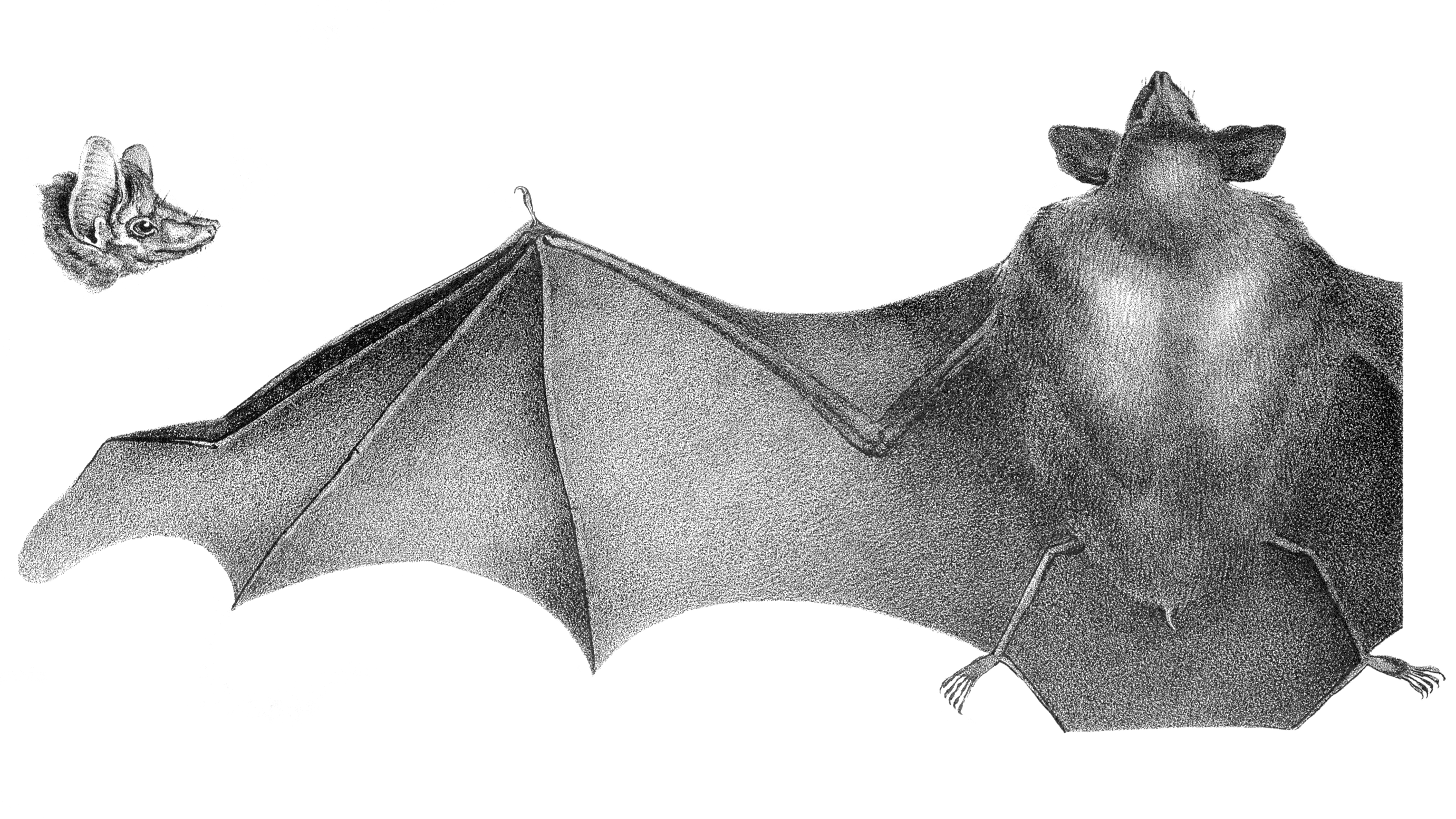

Conservation status
- Least Concern (IUCN 3.1)

Scientific classification
- Kingdom: Animalia
- Phylum: Chordata
- Class: Mammalia
- Order: Chiroptera
- Family: Emballonuridae
- Genus: Emballonura
- Species: E. monticola

Binomial name
- Emballonura monticola Temminck, 1838
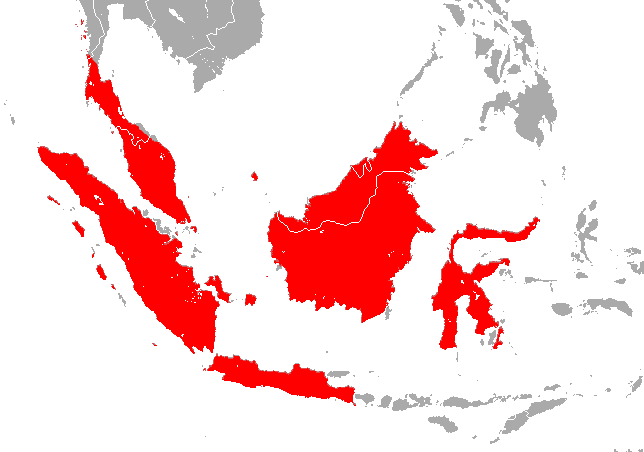
- Lesser sheath-tailed bat range

= Lesser sheath-tailed bat =

Species of bat

The lesser sheath-tailed bat (Emballonura monticola) is a species of sac-winged bat in the family Emballonuridae. It is found in the Malay Peninsula (including Myanmar and Thailand), Borneo, and many other parts of the Indonesian Archipelago including Sulawesi, Java, and Sumatra.
