= Troughton's sheath-tailed bat =

Conservation status
- Least Concern (IUCN 3.1)

Scientific classification
- Kingdom: Animalia
- Phylum: Chordata
- Class: Mammalia
- Order: Chiroptera
- Family: Emballonuridae
- Genus: Taphozous
- Species: T. troughtoni

Binomial name
- Taphozous troughtoni Tate, 1952
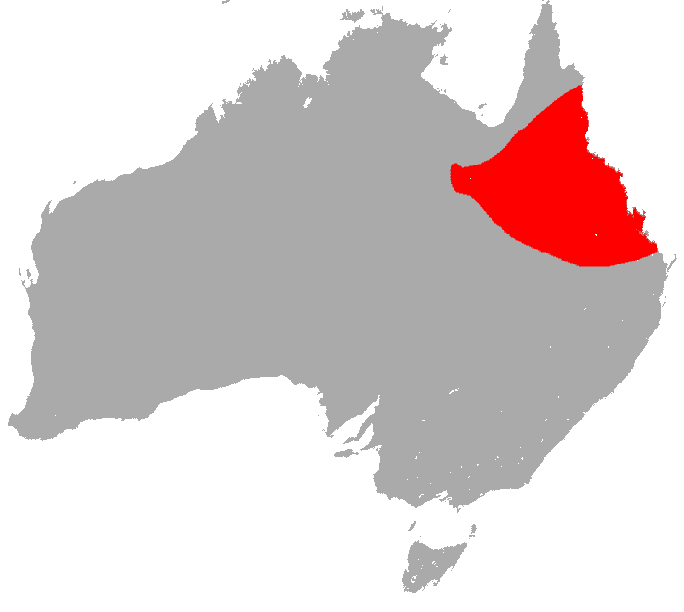
- Troughton's Sheath-tailed Bat range

Species of bat

Troughton's sheath-tailed bat (Taphozous troughtoni) is a species of sheathtail bat in the family Emballonuridae, found only in Australia.
