= List of mammals of New South Wales =

This is a list of mammals of New South Wales.

The following tags are used to highlight each species' conservation status as assessed by the International Union for Conservation of Nature:

| CR | Critically endangered | The species is in imminent risk of extinction in the wild. |
| EN | Endangered | The species is facing an extremely high risk of extinction in the wild. |
| VU | Vulnerable | The species is facing a high risk of extinction in the wild. |
| DD | Data deficient | There is inadequate information to make an assessment of the risks to this species. |

Some species were assessed using an earlier set of criteria. Species assessed using this system have the following instead of near threatened and least concern categories:

| LR/cd | Lower risk/conservation dependent | Species which were the focus of conservation programmes and may have moved into a higher risk category if that programme was discontinued. |
| LR/nt | Lower risk/near threatened | Species which are close to being classified as vulnerable but are not the subject of conservation programmes. |
| LR/lc | Lower risk/least concern | Species for which there are no identifiable risks. |

== Subclass: Prototheria ==
=== Order: Monotremata ===
- Family: Ornithorhynchidae
  - Genus: Ornithorhynchus
    - Platypus, Ornithorhynchus anatinus LR/lc
- Family: Tachyglossidae
  - Genus: Tachyglossus
    - Short-beaked echidna, Tachyglossus aculeatus LR/lc

== Subclass: Theria ==
=== Infraclass: Marsupialia ===
==== Order: Dasyuromorphia ====
- Family: Dasyuridae
  - Subfamily: Dasyurinae
    - Tribe: Phascogalini
      - Genus: Antechinus
        - Agile antechinus, Antechinus agilis LR/lc
        - Yellow-footed antechinus, Antechinus flavipes LR/lc
        - Brown antechinus, Antechinus stuartii LR/lc
        - Dusky antechinus, Antechinus swainsonii LR/lc
      - Genus: Dasycercus
        - Crest-tailed mulgara, Dasycercus cristicauda LR/lc
      - Genus: Dasyurus
        - Western quoll, Dasyurus geoffroii LR/nt
        - Tiger quoll, Dasyurus maculatus LR/nt
        - Eastern quoll, Dasyurus viverrinus EN reintroduced
      - Genus: Sarcophilus
        - Tasmanian devil, Sarcophilus harrisii EN reintroduced
      - Genus: Phascogale
        - Brush-tailed phascogale, Phascogale tapoatafa LR/nt
  - Subfamily: Sminthopsinae
    - Tribe: Sminthopsini
      - Genus: Antechinomys
        - Kultarr, Antechinomys laniger LR/lc
      - Genus: Ningaui
        - Southern ningaui, Ningaui yvonneae LR/lc
      - Genus: Sminthopsis
        - Fat-tailed dunnart, Sminthopsis crassicaudata LR/lc
        - White-footed dunnart, Sminthopsis leucopus VU
        - Stripe-faced dunnart, Sminthopsis macroura LR/lc
        - Slender-tailed dunnart, Sminthopsis murina LR/lc
    - Tribe: Planigalini
      - Genus: Planigale
        - Paucident planigale, Planigale gilesi LR/lc
        - Common planigale, Planigale maculata LR/lc
        - Narrow-nosed planigale, Planigale tenuirostris LR/lc
  - Family: Myrmecobiidae
      - Genus: Myrmecobius
        - Numbat, Myrmecobius fasciatus EN

==== Order: Diprotodontia ====
- Suborder: Phalangeriformes
  - Family: Acrobatidae
    - Genus: Acrobates
      - Feathertail glider, Acrobates pygmaeus LR/lc
  - Family: Burramyidae
    - Genus: Burramys
      - Mountain pygmy possum, Burramys parvus CR
    - Genus: Cercartetus
      - Southwestern pygmy possum, Cercartetus concinnus LR/lc
      - Eastern pygmy possum, Cercartetus nanus LR/lc
  - Family: Petauridae
    - Genus: Petaurus
      - Yellow-bellied glider, Petaurus australis LR/lc
      - Sugar glider, Petaurus breviceps LR/lc
      - Krefft's glider, Petaurus notatus NE
      - Squirrel glider, Petaurus norfolcensis LR/lc
  - Family: Phalangeridae
    - Genus: Trichosurus
      - Short-eared possum, Trichosurus caninus LR/lc
      - Common brushtail possum, Trichosurus vulpecula LR/lc
  - Family: Pseudocheiridae
    - Genus: Petauroides
      - Greater glider, Petauroides volans LR/lc
    - Genus: Pseudocheirus
      - Common ringtail possum, Pseudocheirus peregrinus LR/lc
- Suborder Macropodiformes
  - Family: Macropodidae
    - Genus: Macropus
      - Western grey kangaroo, Macropus fuliginosus LR/lc
      - Eastern grey kangaroo, Macropus giganteus LR/lc
    - Genus: Notamacropus
      - Parma wallaby, N. parma LR/nt
      - Whiptail wallaby, N. parryi LR/lc
      - Red-necked wallaby, N. rufogriseus LR/lc
    - Genus: Osphranter
      - Common wallaroo, O. robustus LR/lc
      - Red kangaroo, O. rufus LR/lc
    - Genus: Onychogalea
      - Bridled nail-tail wallaby, Onychogalea fraenata EN
    - Genus: Petrogale
      - Brush-tailed rock-wallaby, Petrogale penicillata LR/nt
      - Yellow-footed rock-wallaby, Petrogale xanthopus LR/nt
    - Genus: Thylogale
      - Red-legged pademelon, Thylogale stigmatica LR/lc
      - Red-necked pademelon, Thylogale thetis LR/lc
    - Genus: Wallabia
      - Swamp wallaby, Wallabia bicolor LR/lc
  - Family: Potoroidae
    - Genus: Aepyprymnus
      - Rufous rat-kangaroo, Aepyprymnus rufescens LR/lc
    - Genus: Bettongia
      - Boodie, Bettongia leseur LR/nt
    - Genus: Potorous
      - Long-footed potoroo, Potorous longipes EN
      - Long-nosed potoroo, Potorous tridactylus LR/lc
- Suborder: Vombatiformes
  - Family: Phascolarctidae
    - Genus: Phascolarctos
      - Koala, Phascolarctos cinereus LR/lc
  - Family: Vombatidae
    - Genus: Lasiorhinus
      - Southern hairy-nosed wombat, Lasiorhinus latifrons LR/lc
    - Genus: Vombatus
      - Common wombat, Vombatus ursinus LR/lc

==== Order: Peramelemorphia ====
- Family: Peramelidae
  - Genus: Isoodon
    - Northern brown bandicoot, Isoodon macrourus LR/lc
    - Southern brown bandicoot, Isoodon obesulus E
  - Genus: Perameles
    - Long-nosed bandicoot, Perameles nasuta LR/lc
- Family: Thylacomyidae
  - Genus: Macrotis
    - Bilby, Macrotis lagotis VU

=== Infraclass: Placentalia ===
==== Order: Artiodactyla ====
- Suborder: Ruminantia
  - Family: Cervidae
    - Genus: Dama
      - Common fallow deer, Dama dama LC introduced
    - Genus: Rusa
      - Javan rusa, Rusa timorensis VU introduced

==== Order: Carnivora ====
- Suborder: Caniformia
  - Family: Canidae
    - Genus: Canis
      - Dingo, Canis lupus dingo
    - Genus: Vulpes
      - Red fox, Vulpes vulpes LR/lc introduced
  - Family Otariidae
    - Genus: Arctocephalus
      - New Zealand fur seal, Arctocephalus forsteri LR/lc
      - Brown fur seal, Arctocephalus pusillus LR/lc
      - Subantarctic fur seal, Arctocephalus tropicalis LR/lc
    - Genus: Neophoca
      - Australian sea lion, Neophoca cinerea EN
  - Family: Phocidae
    - Genus: Hydrurga
      - Leopard seal, Hydrurga leptonyx LR/lc
    - Genus: Lobodon
      - Crabeater seal, Lobodon carcinophagus
    - Genus: Mirounga
      - Southern elephant seal, Mirounga leonina LR/lc

==== Order: Cetacea ====
- Suborder: Mysticeti
  - Family: Balaenidae
    - Genus: Eubalaena
      - Southern right whale, Eubalaena australis LR/lc
  - Family: Balaenopteridae
    - Genus: Balaenoptera
      - Antarctic minke whale, Balaenoptera bonaerensis DD
      - Bryde's whale, Balaenoptera brydei DD
      - Blue whale, Balaenoptera musculus EN
      - Fin whale, Balaenoptera physalus EN
    - Genus: Megaptera
      - Humpback whale, Megaptera novaeangliae LR/lc
  - Family: Cetotheriidae
    - Genus: Caperea
      - Pygmy right whale, Caparea marginata DD
- Suborder: Odontoceti
  - Family: Delphinidae
    - Genus: Feresa
      - Pygmy killer whale, Feresa attenuata DD
    - Genus: Globicephala
      - Short-finned pilot whale, Globicephala macrorhynchus DD
      - Long-finned pilot whale, Globicephala melas DD
    - Genus: Grampus
      - Risso's dolphin, Grampus griseus LR/lc
    - Genus: Lagenodelphis
      - Fraser's dolphin, Lagenodelphis hosei LR/lc
    - Genus: Lissodelphis
      - Southern right whale dolphin, Lissodelphis peronii DD
    - Genus: Orcinus
      - Killer whale or orca, Orcinus orca DD
    - Genus: Peponocephala
      - Melon-headed whale, Peponocephala electra LR/lc
    - Genus: Pseudorca
      - False killer whale, Pseudorca crassidens EN
    - Genus: Sousa
      - Indo-Pacific humpbacked dolphin, Sousa chinensis LR/nt
    - Genus: Stenella
      - Pantropical spotted dolphin, Stenella attenuata LR/lc
      - Spinner dolphin, Stenella longirostris DD
      - Striped dolphin, Stenella coeruleoalba LR/lc
    - Genus: Steno
      - Rough-toothed dolphin, Steno bredanensis LR/lc
    - Genus: Tursiops
      - Indo-Pacific bottlenose dolphin, Tursiops aduncus LR/nt
      - Common bottlenose dolphin, Tursiops truncatus LR/lc
  - Family: Physeteridae
    - Genus: Kogia
      - Pygmy sperm whale, Kogia breviceps DD
      - Dwarf sperm whale, Kogia sima DD
    - Genus: Physeter
      - Sperm whale, Physeter macrocephalus VU
  - Family: Ziphiidae
    - Genus: Hyperoodon
      - Southern bottlenose whale, Hyperoodon planifrons LR/lc
    - Genus: Mesoplodon
      - Andrews' beaked whale, Mesoplodon bowdoini DD
      - Blainville's beaked whale, Mesoplodon densirostris DD
      - Ginkgo-toothed beaked whale, Mesoplodon ginkgodens DD
      - Gray's beaked whale, Mesoplodon grayi DD
      - Strap-toothed whale, Mesoplodon layardii DD

==== Order: Chiroptera ====
- Suborder: Megachiroptera
  - Family: Pteropodidae
    - Genus: Nyctimene
      - Eastern tube-nosed bat, Nyctimene robinsoni LR/lc
    - Genus: Pteropus
      - Black flying fox, Pteropus alecto LR/lc
      - Grey-headed flying fox, Pteropus poliocephalus VU
      - Little red flying fox, Pteropus scapulatus LR/lc
    - Genus: Syconycteris
      - Common blossom bat, Syconycteris australis LR/lc
- Suborder: Microchiroptera
  - Family: Emballonuridae
    - Genus: Saccolaimus
      - Yellow-bellied sheath-tailed bat, Saccolaimus flaviventris LR/nt
    - Genus: Taphozous
      - Coastal sheath-tailed bat, Taphozous australis LR/nt
  - Family: Molossidae
    - Genus: Mormopterus
      - Beccari's free-tailed bat, Mormopterus beccarii LR/lc
      - East-coast free-tailed bat, Mormopterus norfolkensis VU
      - Southern free-tailed bat, Mormopterus planiceps LR/lc
    - Genus: Ozimops
      - Loria's mastiff bat, Ozimops loriae
    - Genus: Tadarida
      - White-striped free-tailed bat, Tadarida australis LR/lc
  - Family: Vespertilionidae
    - Genus: Chalinolobus
      - Large-eared pied bat, Chalinolobus dwyeri LR/nt
      - Gould's wattled bat, Chalinolobus gouldii LR/lc
      - Chocolate wattled bat, Calinolobus morio LR/lc
      - Hoary wattled bat, Chaliniolobus nigrogriseus LR/lc
      - Little pied bat, Chalinolobus picatus LR/nt
    - Genus: Falsistrellus
      - Eastern false pipistrelle, Falsistrellus tasmaniensis LR/lc
    - Genus: Miniopterus
      - Little bent-wing bat, Miniopterus australis LR/lc
      - Common bent-wing bat, Miniopterus schreibersii LR/cd
    - Genus: Myotis
      - Southern myotis, Myotis macropus LR/lc
    - Genus: Nyctophilus
      - Northern long-eared bat, Nyctophilus arnhemensis LR/lc
      - Eastern long-eared bat, Nyctophilus bifax LR/lc
      - Lesser long-eared bat, Nyctophilus geoffroyi LR/lc
      - Gould's long-eared bat, Nyctophilus gouldi LR/lc
      - Greater long-eared bat, Nyctophilus timoriensis DD
    - Genus: Phoniscus
      - Golden-tipped bat, Phoniscus papuensis LR/lc
    - Genus: Scoteanax
      - Rüppell's broad-nosed bat, Scoteanax rueppellii LR/lc
    - Genus: Scotorepens
      - Inland broad-nosed bat, Scotorepens balstoni LR/lc
      - Little broad-nosed bat, Scotorepens greyii LR/lc
      - Eastern broad-nosed bat, Scotorepens orion LR/lc
    - Genus: Vespadelus
      - Inland forest bat, Vespadelus baverstocki LR/lc
      - Large forest bat, Vespadelus darlingtoni LR/lc
      - Eastern forest bat, Vespadelus pumilus LR/lc
      - Southern forest bat, Vespadelus regulus LR/lc
      - Eastern cave bat, Vespadelus troughtoni LR/lc
      - Little forest bat, Vespadelus vulturnus LR/lc
- Suborder: Yinpterochiroptera
  - Family: Rhinolophidae
    - Genus: Rhinolophus
      - Smaller horseshoe bat, Rhinolophus megaphyllus LR/lc

==== Order: Lagomorpha ====
- Family: Leporidae
  - Genus: Lepus
    - European hare, Lepus europaeus LC introduced
  - Genus: Oryctolagus
    - European rabbit, Oryctolagus cuniculus EN introduced

==== Order: Rodentia ====
- Family: Muridae
  - Genus: Hydromys
    - Rakali, Hydromys chrysogaster LR/lc
  - Genus: Leggadina
    - Forrest's mouse, Leggadina forresti LR/lc
  - Genus: Leporillus
    - Lesser stick-nest rat, Leporillus apicalis CR
    - Greater stick-nest rat, Leporillus conditor VU
  - Genus: Mastacomys
    - Broad-toothed mouse, Mastacomys fuscus LR/nt
  - Genus: Melomys
    - Grassland mosaic-tailed rat, Melomys burtoni LR/lc
    - Fawn-footed mosaic-tailed rat, Melomys cervinipes LR/lc
  - Genus: Mus
    - House mouse, Mus musculus LR/lc introduced
  - Genus: Notomys
    - Fawn hopping mouse, Notomys cervinus VU
    - Dusky hopping mouse, Notomys fuscus VU
    - Mitchell's hopping mouse, Notomys mitchellii LR/lc
  - Genus: Pseudomys
    - Silky mouse, Pseudomys apodemoides LR/lc
    - Plains rat, Pseudomys australis VU
    - Bolam's mouse, Pseudomys bolami LR/lc
    - Little native mouse, Pseudomys delicatulus LR/lc
    - Desert mouse, Pseudomys desertor LR/nt
    - Smoky mouse, Pseudomys fumeus EN
    - Eastern chestnut mouse, Pseudomys gracilicaudatus LR/lc
    - Sandy inland mouse, Pseudomys hermannsburgensis LR/lc
    - New Holland mouse, Pseudomys novaehollandiae VU
    - Hastings River mouse, Pseudomys oralis VU
    - Pilliga mouse, Pseudomys pilligaensis VU
  - Genus: Rattus
    - Bush rat, Rattus fuscipes LR/lc
    - Australian swamp rat, Rattus lutreolus LR/lc
    - Brown rat, Rattus norvegicus LR/lc introduced
    - Black rat, Rattus rattus LR/lc introduced
    - Dusky field rat, Rattus sordidus LR/nt
    - Pale field rat, Rattus tunneyi LR/nt
    - Long-haired rat, Rattus villosissimus LR/lc

==== Order: Sirenia ====
- Family: Dugonginae
  - Genus: Dugong
    - Dugong, Dugong dugon VU
