= List of mammals of Victoria =

This is a list of mammals of Victoria, Australia:

- Acrobates pygmaeus (feathertail glider)
- Aepyprymnus rufescens (rufous rat-kangaroo)
- Antechinus agilis (agile antechinus)
- Antechinus flavipes (yellow-footed antechinus)
- Antechinus minimus (swamp antechinus)
- Antechinus swainsonii (dusky antechinus)
- Arctocephalus pusillus (Cape fur seal)
- Arctophoca forsteri (New Zealand fur seal)
- Arctophoca tropicalis (subantarctic fur seal)
- Austronomus australis (white-striped freetail bat)
- Axis axis (axis deer) introduced
- Axis porcinus (Indian hog deer)
- Balaenoptera acutorostrata (minke whale)
- Balaenoptera edeni (Bryde's whale)
- Balaenoptera musculus (blue whale)
- Balaenoptera physalus (fin whale)
- Bettongia gaimardi (eastern bettong)
- Bettongia penicillata (woylie)
- Burramys parvus (mountain pygmy possum)
- Canis familiaris dingo (dingo)
- Caperea marginata (pygmy right whale)
- Cercartetus concinnus (southwestern pygmy possum)
- Cercartetus lepidus (Tasmanian pygmy possum)
- Cercartetus nanus (eastern pygmy possum)
- Chalinolobus gouldii (Gould's wattled bat)
- Chalinolobus morio (chocolate wattled bat)
- Chaeropus ecaudatus (pig-footed bandicoot) extinct
- Conilurus albipes (white-footed rabbit-rat) extinct
- Dama dama (common fallow deer) introduced
- Dasyurus maculatus (tiger quoll)
- Dasyurus geoffroii (western quoll)
- Dasyurus viverrinus (eastern quoll) reintroduced
- Delphinus delphis (short-beaked common dolphin)
- Eubalaena australis (southern right whale)
- Falsistrellus tasmaniensis (eastern false pipistrelle)
- Globicephala melas (long-finned pilot whale)
- Grampus griseus (Risso's dolphin)
- Gymnobelideus leadbeateri (Leadbeater's possum)
- Hydromys chrysogaster (water rat)
- Hydrurga leptonyx (leopard seal)
- Hyperoodon planifrons (bottlenose whale)
- Isoodon obesulus (southern brown bandicoot)
- Kogia breviceps (pygmy sperm whale)
- Lagenodelphis hosei (Fraser's dolphin)
- Lagorchestes leporides (eastern hare-wallaby) extinct
- Lepus europaeus (European hare) introduced
- Leporillus apicalis (lesser stick rat)
- Lobodon carcinophaga (crabeater seal)
- Macropus fuliginosus (western grey kangaroo)
- Macropus giganteus (eastern grey kangaroo)
- Macrotis lagotis (greater bilby)
- Mastacomys fuscus (broad-toothed mouse)
- Megaptera novaeangliae (humpback whale)
- Mesoplodon bowdoini (Andrews' beaked whale)
- Mesoplodon densirostris (Blainville's beaked whale)
- Mesoplodon ginkgodens (ginkgo-toothed beaked whale)
- Mesoplodon grayi (Gray's beaked whale)
- Mesoplodon layardii (Layard's beaked whale)
- Mesoplodon mirus (True's beaked whale)
- Miniopterus schreibersii (common bentwing bat)
- Mirounga leonina (southern elephant seal)
- Mormopterus planiceps (southern free-tailed bat)
- Mus musculus (house mouse) introduced
- Myotis adversus (large-footed bat)
- Myotis macropus (southern myotis)
- Neophoca cinerea (Australian sea lion)
- Ningaui yvonneae (southern ningaui)
- Notamacropus greyi (toolache wallaby) extinct
- Notamacropus rufogriseus (red-necked wallaby)
- Notomys mitchellii (Mitchell's hopping mouse)
- Nyctophilus geoffroyi (lesser long-eared bat)
- Nyctophilus gouldi (Gould's long-eared bat)
- Nyctophilus timoriensis (greater long-eared bat)
- Onychogalea fraenata (bridled nail-tail wallaby)
- Orcinus orca (orca)
- Ornithorhynchus anatinus (platypus)
- Oryctolagus cuniculus (European rabbit) introduced
- Osphranter robustus (eastern wallaroo)
- Osphranter rufus (red kangaroo)
- Perameles bougainville (western barred bandicoot)
- Perameles gunnii (eastern barred bandicoot)
- Perameles nasuta (long-nosed bandicoot)
- Petauroides volans (greater glider)
- Petaurus australis (yellow-bellied glider)
- Petaurus notatus (Krefft's glider)
- Petaurus norfolcensis (squirrel glider)
- Petrogale penicillata (brush-tailed rock-wallaby)
- Phascogale calura (red-tailed phascogale)
- Phascogale tapoatafa (brush-tailed phascogale)
- Phascolarctos cinereus (koala)
- Physeter macrocephalus (sperm whale)
- Planigale gilesi (paucident planigale)
- Potorous longipes (long-footed potoroo)
- Potorous tridactylus (long-nosed potoroo)
- Pseudocheirus peregrinus (common ringtail possum)
- Pseudomys apodemoides (silky mouse)
- Pseudomys australis (plains rat)
- Pseudomys bolami (Bolam's mouse)
- Pseudomys desertor (brown desert mouse)
- Pseudomys fumeus (smoky mouse)
- Pseudomys gouldii (Gould's mouse)
- Pseudomys novaehollandiae (New Holland mouse)
- Pseudomys shortridgei (heath mouse)
- Pseudorca crassidens (false killer whale)
- Pteropus poliocephalus (grey-headed flying-fox)
- Pteropus scapulatus (little red flying-fox)
- Rattus fuscipes (bush rat)
- Rattus lutreolus (Australian swamp rat)
- Rattus norvegicus (brown rat) introduced
- Rattus rattus (black rat) introduced
- Rhinolophus megaphyllus (smaller horseshoe bat)
- Rusa timorensis (Javan rusa) introduced
- Saccolaimus flaviventris (yellow-bellied pouched bat)
- Scotorepens balstoni (western broad-nosed bat)
- Scotorepens orion (eastern broad-nosed bat)
- Sminthopsis crassicaudata (fat-tailed dunnart)
- Sminthopsis leucopus (white-footed dunnart)
- Sminthopsis murina (slender-tailed dunnart)
- Tachyglossus aculeatus (short-beaked echidna)
- Tadarida australis (white-striped free-tailed bat)
- Thylogale billardierii (Tasmanian pademelon)
- Trichosurus caninus (short-eared possum)
- Trichosurus vulpecula (common brushtail possum)
- Tursiops australis (burrunan dolphin)
- Tursiops truncatus (bottlenose dolphin)
- Vespadelus baverstocki (inland forest bat)
- Vespadelus darlingtoni (large forest bat)
- Vespadelus regulus (southern forest bat)
- Vespadelus vulturnus (little forest bat)
- Vombatus ursinus (common wombat)
- Vulpes vulpes (red fox) introduced
- Wallabia bicolor (swamp wallaby)
- Ziphius cavirostris (Cuvier's beaked whale)
