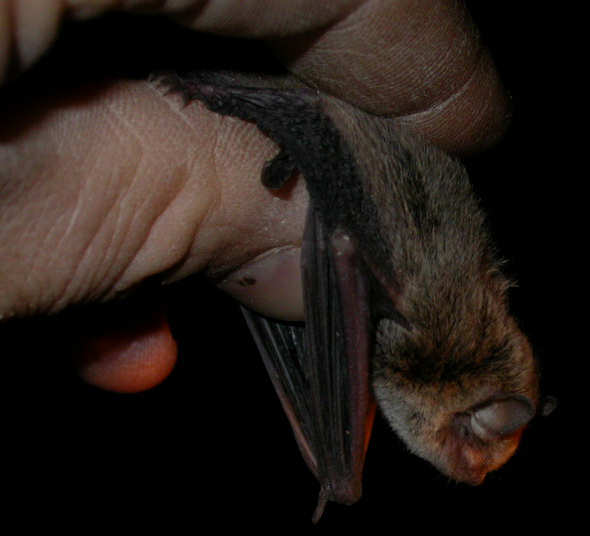
- Little forest bat (Vespadelus vulturnus)

Scientific classification
- Kingdom: Animalia
- Phylum: Chordata
- Class: Mammalia
- Order: Chiroptera
- Family: Vespertilionidae
- Genus: Vespadelus; Troughton, 1943

Type species
- Scotophilus pumilus Gray, 1841

Species
- See text

= Vespadelus =

Genus of bats

Vespadelus is a genus of Australian bats in the family Vespertilionidae.

The genus name was first published by Ellis Le Geyt Troughton and Tom Iredale in 1934, but without an adequate description; the type was cited as Scotophilus pumilus Gray, 1841. The 1934 review included taxa previously ascribed to other genera and placed these with the proposed arrangement, the type species was assigned to a new combination as Vespadelus pumilus. Troughton later provided a diagnosis for the genus in 1943, making this name available. Other circumscriptions have assigned these species to genera Pipistrellus and Eptesicus. Reëlevated to genus with new combinations. Also known as forest bats, cave bats, little brown bats.

An earlier treatment of populations had placed them as the sole species of Eptesicus (E. pumilus). The separation to this genus followed comparative studies that recognised its diversity and nominated new species (Kitchener, 1987; Queale.). Subsequent authors recognition of the arrangement published as Vespadelus by Troughton in 1943 saw the name of this genus reëstablished.

The following nine species are currently recognised.

- Vespadelus baverstocki (Kitchener et al, 1987). a.k.a. Baverstock's or inland forest bat
- Vespadelus caurinus (Thomas, 1914). northern cave bat
- Vespadelus darlingtoni. (Allen, 1933). large forest bat
- Vespadelus douglasorum (Kitchener, 1976). yellow-lipped bat
- Vespadelus finlaysoni. (Kitchener et al, 1987). Finlayson's cave bat
- Vespadelus pumilus (Gray, 1841). eastern forest bat
- Vespadelus regulus (Thomas, 1906). southern forest bat
- Vespadelus troughtoni. eastern cave bat
- Vespadelus vulturnus. little forest bat
