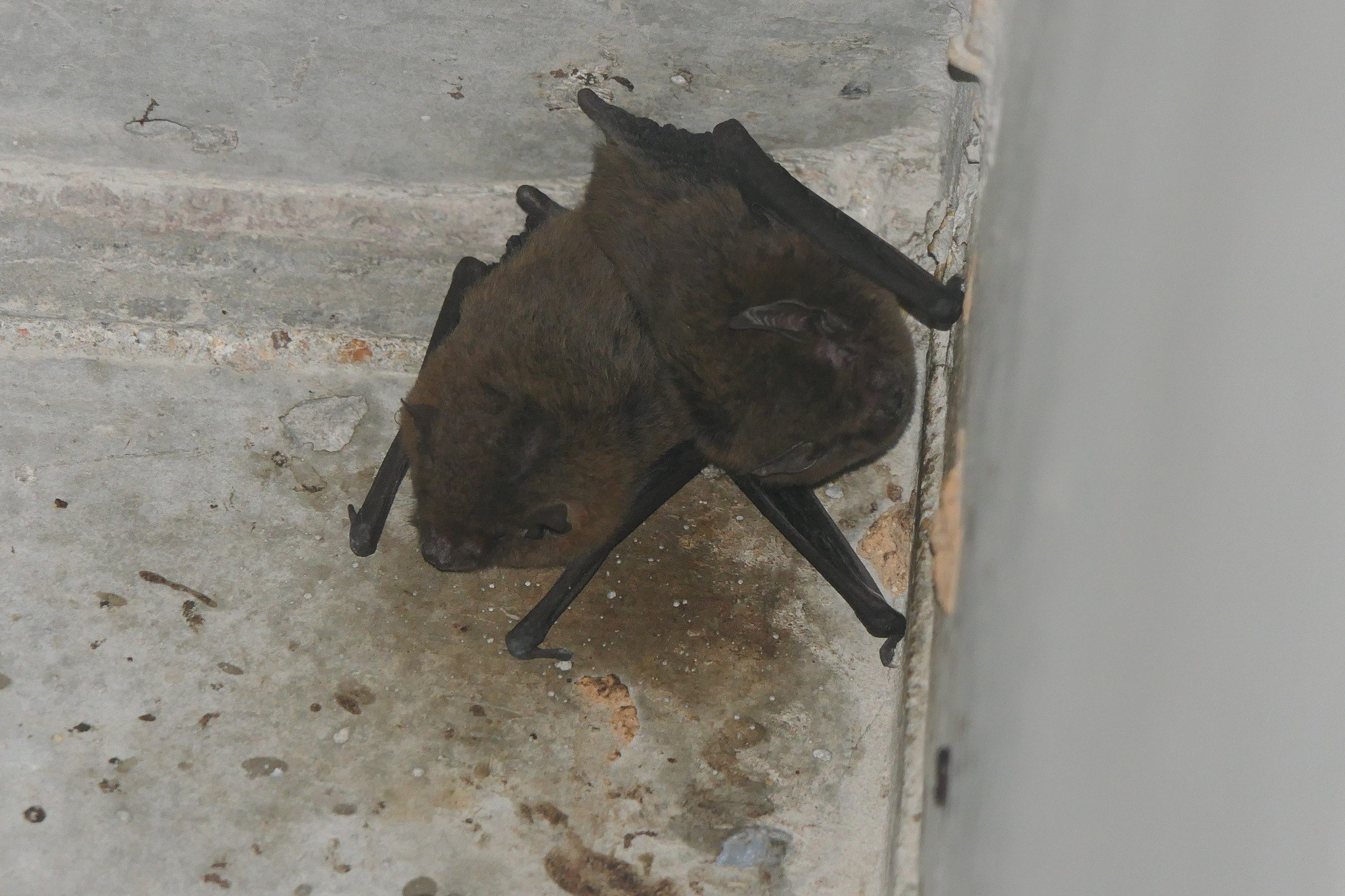

Conservation status
- Least Concern (IUCN 3.1)

Scientific classification
- Kingdom: Animalia
- Phylum: Chordata
- Class: Mammalia
- Order: Chiroptera
- Family: Vespertilionidae
- Genus: Vespadelus
- Species: V. troughtoni

Binomial name
- Vespadelus troughtoni (Kitchener, Jones & Caputi, 1987)

Synonyms
- Eptesicus troughtoni Kitchener, Jones & Caputi, 1987

= Eastern cave bat =

Species of bat

The eastern cave bat or Troughton's forest bat (Vespadelus troughtoni) is a species of vesper bat in the family Vespertilionidae. It is found only in Australia, where it lives in caves along the east coast of Queensland and New South Wales, and in adjacent inland ranges.

This species is similar in appearance to and may easily be mistaken for other microbats that share its range, such as the large-footed myotis Myotis macropus.
