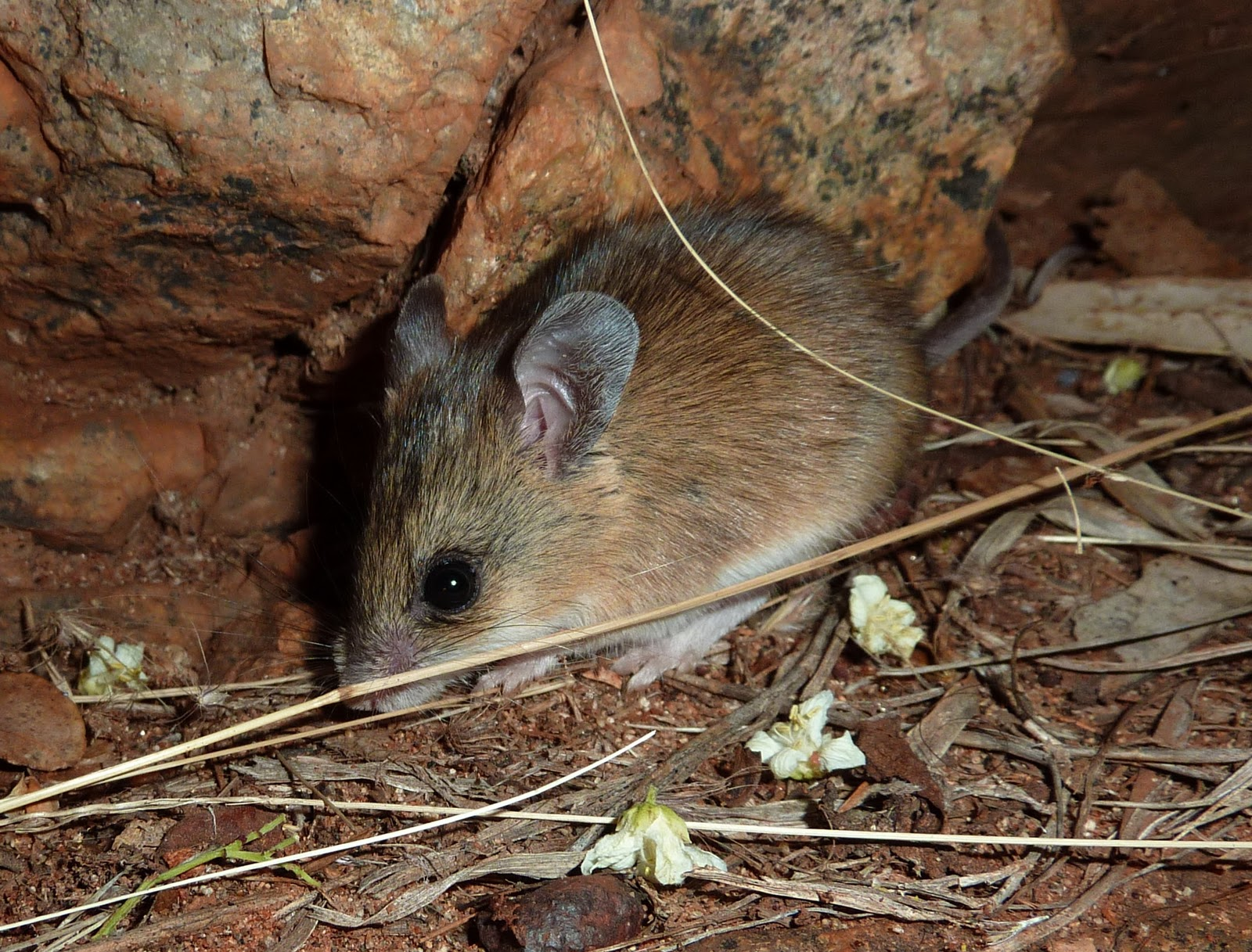

Conservation status
- Least Concern (IUCN 3.1)

Scientific classification
- Kingdom: Animalia
- Phylum: Chordata
- Class: Mammalia
- Infraclass: Placentalia
- Order: Rodentia
- Family: Muridae
- Genus: Pseudomys
- Species: P. hermannsburgensis

Binomial name
- Pseudomys hermannsburgensis (Waite, 1896)
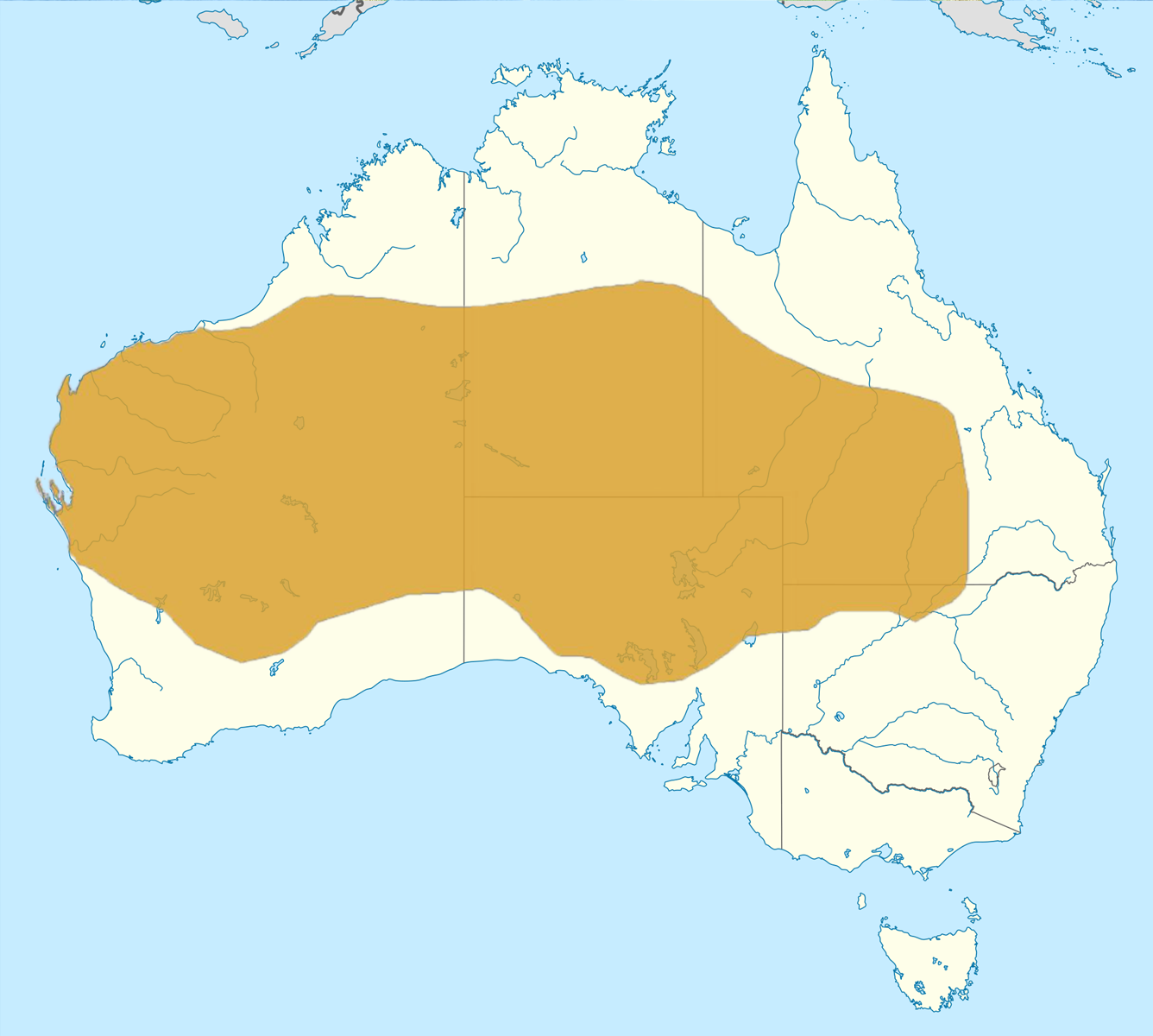
- Sandy inland mouse range

Synonyms
- Mus hermannsburgensis; Leggadina hermannsburgensis brazenori

= Sandy inland mouse =

Species of rodent

The sandy inland mouse (Pseudomys hermannsburgensis) is a species of rodent in the family Muridae. Also known as the Hermannsburg (Mission) false-mouse or Hermannsburg mouse, it is endemic to Australia and found widely yet sparsely through arid and semi-arid areas.

== Description ==
The sandy inland mouse is greyish-brown to sandy-brown with off-white underside. Adults weigh approximately 9 to 15 grams, and measure 55–80 mm from nose to base of tail with a tail between 70 and 90 mm. Physically similar to the several other species including the house mouse it differs in lacking the notched incisors and distinctive musty odour of M. domesticus. The sandy inland mouse can be distinguished from several species including P. chapmani, P. delicatulus and Mus musculus by the pattern of the footpads. Furthermore, it has smaller ears and hind feet than Bolam's mouse, and the tail is shorter and less heavily furred allowing distinction between the two species.

== Taxonomy and naming ==
The sandy inland mouse was first described by ham (1896) as Mus hermannsburgensis following the Horn scientific expedition in 1894 during which the natural history of central Australia was studied. Following this it was placed in Pseudomys and Leggadina by various people, but has prevailed in Pseudomys since 1970.

Leggadina hermannsburgensis brazenori has been identified as a synonym of Pseudomys hermannsburgensis, and while it has no currently identified subspecies Pseudomys bolami was previously thought of as a subspecies.

== Distribution ==
Endemic to Australia, the sandy inland mouse can be found widely yet sparsely throughout arid and semi-arid areas of central southern and western Australia.

The sandy inland mouse is present through New South Wales, Queensland, Western Australia, South Australia and the Northern Territory. The major focus of studies on the species appears to centre on NSW where it has been found in Sturt National Park, Fowlers Gap Station north of Broken Hill, near Kajuligah Nature Reserve north of Ivanhoe, the Enngonia area north-east of Bourke, and at several locations in the Tibooburra area. It is also found on some islands off the coast of Western Australia, including Dirk Hartog, Dixon, Rosemary, and Hope off the Pilbara. Populations in central Australia are thought to be largely sedentary despite observations of individuals covering distances of up to 14 km in NSW and Queensland

== Habitat ==
Sandy inland mouse habitat is generally characterised by open vegetation, with a preference for friable soils such as sands and sandy loams on arid plains and dunes. Examples include, hummock grasslands, Mulga flats, alluvial flats and gibber plains, with Coolibah and Acacia woodlands having been observed as popular habitat.

With a diet heavy in spinifex seed the sandy inland mouse is known to forage under heavy spinifex cover, with a preference for burnt over unburnt habitat.

== Ecology ==
=== Life cycle ===
Nocturnal in nature, the sandy inland mouse will hide in burrows up to 50 cm underground during the day sometimes in the burrows of other animals. During non-breeding periods large congregation of individuals in a single burrow are common, while during breeding periods groups are generally smaller, with four or five members. Burrows have been characterised by the absence of a soil mound by the entrance.

Despite some previous observations of individuals entering a torpor like state it is believed that sandy inland mouse do not use torpor as an energy or water conservation strategy. However, they are understood to be able to survive hypothermia.

=== Diet ===
The sandy inland mouse is omnivorous, feeding on a range of plant and animal matter depending upon availability. While grains, in particular spinifex seed and other plant materials make ups the bulk of the mouse's diet during autumn the proportion of invertebrates consumed has been observed to increase considerably, to as much as 60% of food intake. Spiders are the most common invertebrate found in the diet, with beetles and beetle larvae also being eaten. It has been proposed that the increase in invertebrate consumption during autumn is a function of increased invertebrate numbers which result following rain.

Several factors have been listed as reasons for omnivory as its dietary strategy. The sandy inland mouse lacks the physical and behavioural adaptations of the granivorous North American heteromyid such as cheek pouches and seed-caching through scratch digging holes; in addition, it is thought their digestive anatomy makes them better suited to an omnivorous diet. It has also been suggested that due to the extreme nature of the climate in the areas the species inhabits, dietary opportunism is the favoured mechanism for survival.

Trials have indicated that sandy inland mouse will select seed with high water content over seed with lower water content, which is an important dietary adaptation for survival in the conditions of arid Australia. Evidence also exists that it can survive indefinitely on a diet of air dried seed without drinking water.

=== Reproduction ===
Sandy inland mouse does not adhere to a strict seasonal breeding strategy, instead employing a combination of opportunistic and seasonal strategy, breeding following rainfall or when food resources are abundant. Gestation lasts between 29 and 34 days with a typical litter of three or four in captivity litter size can be up to five or six. Young are naked and weigh roughly 2 g at birth, but mature quickly with independence at 30 days and reproductive maturity at three months.

=== Population dynamics ===
Classified as an r-strategist, populations of sandy inland mouse are known to persist in low densities during extended periods of dry conditions in Australia's arid and semi-arid interior, and then erupt dramatically following significant rain. Concomitantly, they exhibit decreased heterozygosity during dry periods and recover healthy levels of genetic diversity following wet periods. Population fluctuations of up to 40 fold have been observed in parts of western Queensland. Fluctuations in population numbers have been primarily linked to food availability which increases following significant rain events.

== Threats ==
Habitat modification because of grazing activity presents the greatest threat to the Sandy Inland mouse, while predation by foxes, cats and barn owls, use of 1080 baits, pesticides, and establishment of artificial water points have all been identified as potential threats to populations of the sandy inland mouse.

== Conservation ==
Sandy inland mouse is listed as least concern in the IUCN Red List of Threatened Species.

In New South Wales the species is listed as vulnerable under Schedule 2 of the Threatened Species Conservation Act 1995 (as of September 2017).

Queensland lists the species as Least Concern under the Nature Conservation Act 1992.

As of May 2024, the species is not listed in any other state or territory listing, additionally the species is not listed under the Australian Commonwealth Environment Protection and Biodiversity Act 1995.
