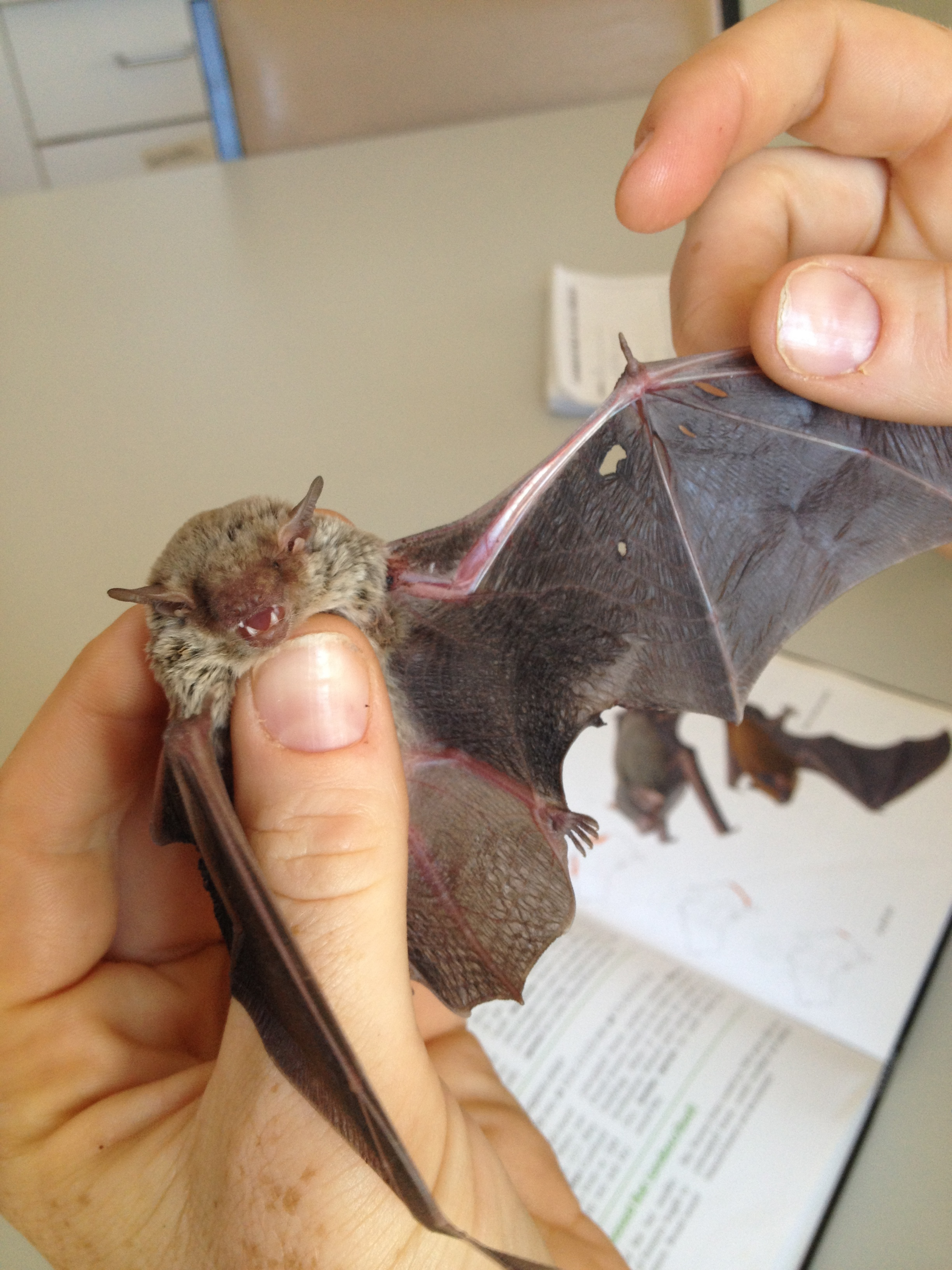
- Inland broad-nosed bat (Scotorepens balstoni)

Scientific classification
- Kingdom: Animalia
- Phylum: Chordata
- Class: Mammalia
- Order: Chiroptera
- Family: Vespertilionidae
- Tribe: Eptesicini
- Genus: Scotorepens; Troughton, 1943

Type species
- Scoteinus orion Troughton, 1937

= Scotorepens =

Genus of bats

Scotorepens is a genus of bats within the Vespertilionidae family. Species within this genus are widely distributed across Australia and to the north at Papua New Guinea and Indonesia.

== Taxonomy ==
The genus was erected by Ellis Troughton in his 1943 volume on Australian mammals, having previously identified new taxa of "broad-nosed bats". The type species is Scoteinus orion, published by Troughton in 1937. The taxa have been allied to the genus Nycticeius, as given in Troughton's earlier descriptions, but recognised as a genus in other author's arrangements. Scotorepens has been allied to the Vespertilionini tribe of the subfamily Vespertilioninae, or grouped with Nycticeiini in earlier revisions.

The authority Mammal Species of the World (2003), recognised the species and subspecies of the genus, which may be summarised as

- Scotorepens

- Scotorepens balstoni the inland broad-nosed bat

- Scotorepens bastoni bastoni
- Scotorepens bastoni influatus

- Scotorepens greyii little broad-nosed
- Scotorepens orion eastern species
- Scotorepens sanborni northern species

The systematics of the genus are suggested to be poorly resolved. An undescribed species somewhat resembling Scotorepens orion, although smaller in size and weight, is designated the "central-eastern broad-nosed bat" pending further investigation.

== Description ==
A genus of moderately small microchiropterans, the face is distinguished the lack of hair on the muzzle or the elaborate nose-leaf structure of other genera.
