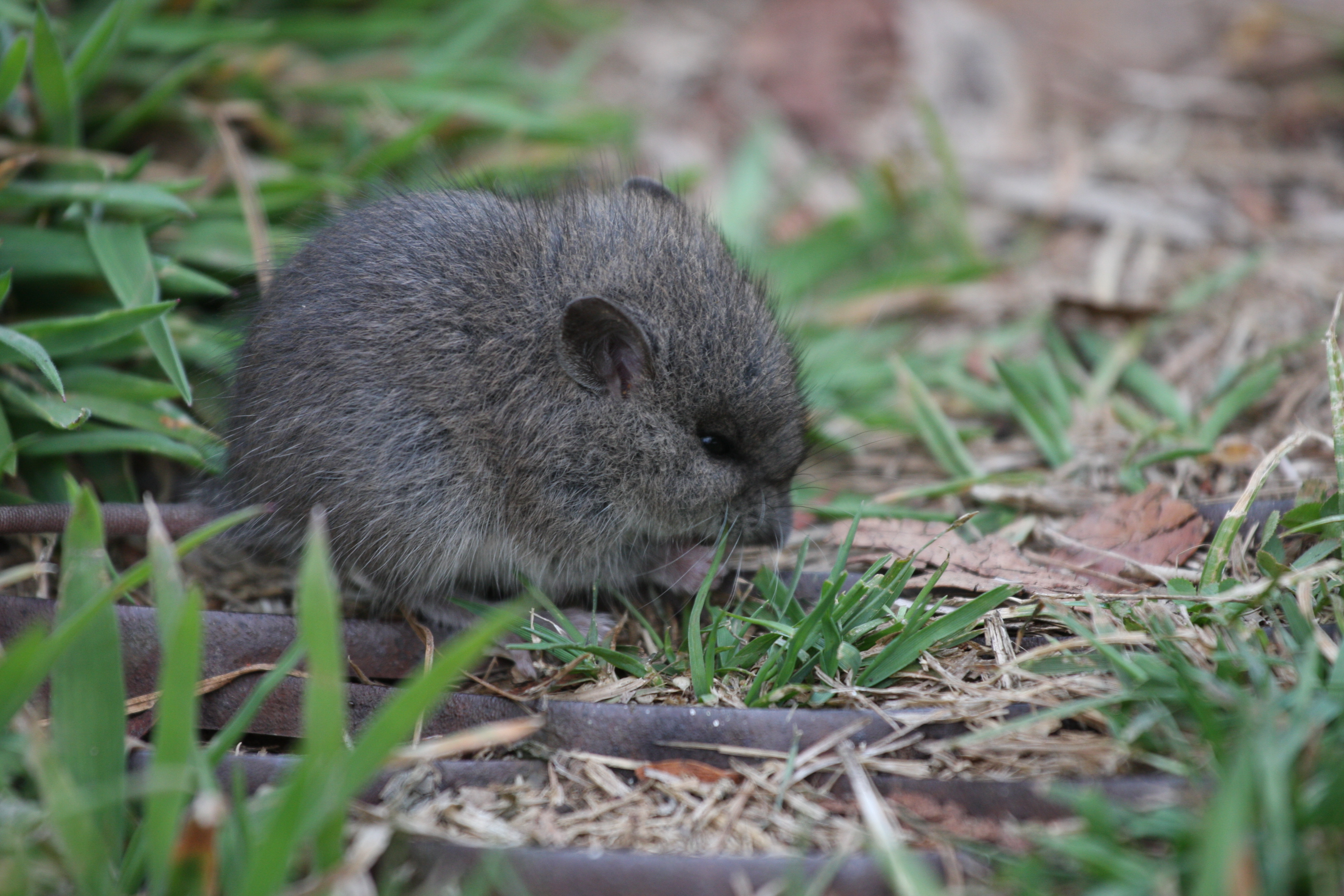

Conservation status
- Near Threatened (IUCN 3.1)

Scientific classification
- Kingdom: Animalia
- Phylum: Chordata
- Class: Mammalia
- Order: Rodentia
- Family: Muridae
- Tribe: Hydromyini
- Genus: Mastacomys; Thomas, 1882
- Species: M. fuscus

Binomial name
- Mastacomys fuscus Thomas, 1882

= Broad-toothed mouse =

Species of rodent

The broad-toothed mouse or broad-toothed rat (Mastacomys fuscus) is a species of rodent in the family Muridae.

== Distribution and habitat ==
It is found only in South-eastern Australia. In Victoria live specimens have been caught in the Snowfields, Great Dividing Range (to Cooma in New South Wales), Gippsland Highlands, Otway Ranges and Wilsons Promontory. Specimens located in scats have been found in the Otway plains and East Gippsland. The species is also recorded in buttongrass sedgeland up to 1000 metres in western Tasmania.

Habitat preferences are areas of herbfields, grasslands and forests with minimal shrubs but a dense covering of sedge, grass, herbs and moss, where precipitation does not fall below 1400 mm per year in alpine areas and others 1000 mm at lower altitudes (DCNR 1995 pp. 208–210).

During the Pleistocene, the broad-toothed mouse dominated Badger Island alongside other grassland-dwelling mammals, but over the course of the Holocene, it and other grassland mammals were replaced with a forest-adapted fauna.
