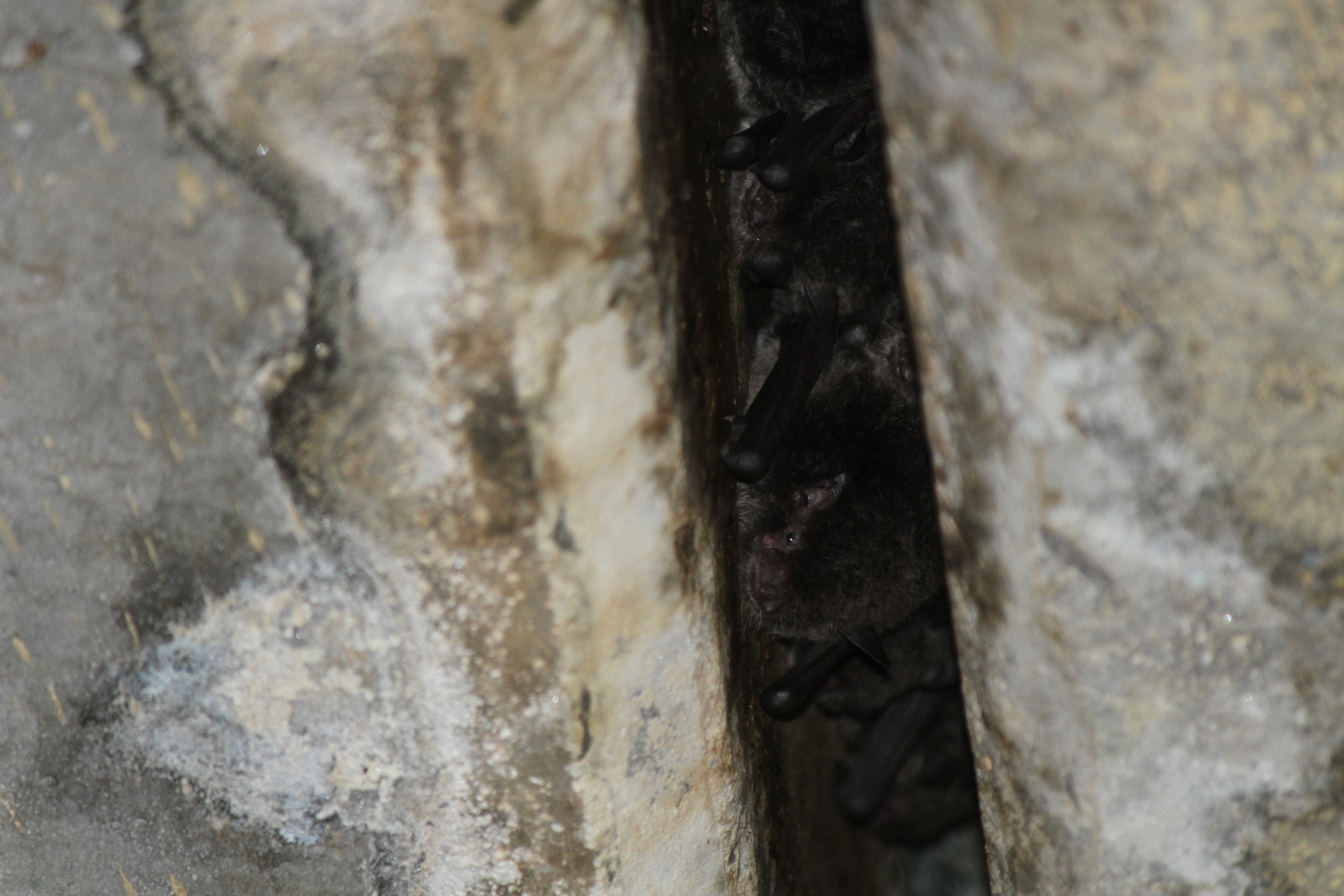
- roosting under a bridge in Termeil (New South Wales, Australia)

Conservation status
- Least Concern (IUCN 3.1)

Scientific classification
- Kingdom: Animalia
- Phylum: Chordata
- Class: Mammalia
- Order: Chiroptera
- Family: Vespertilionidae
- Genus: Myotis
- Species: M. macropus

Binomial name
- Myotis macropus (Gould, 1854)

= Myotis macropus =

Southern myotis Large-footed myotis

Species of bat

The large-footed myotis (Myotis macropus), also known as the southern myotis, is a species of vesper bat (Vespertilionidae) in the genus Myotis. It is one of only two Australian "fishing" bats and feeds by trawling its specially adapted feet along the water's surface for aquatic invertebrates and fish.

== Distribution ==
M. macropus is distributed along the east coast of Australia, from south-east Queensland to New South Wales and Victoria. A smaller presence was also recorded along the coasts of other national territories. It has been recorded west of the Great Dividing Range in the 1970s at a billabong in Boomanoomana State Forest, near Mulwala and the Murray River.

== Conservation ==
M. macropus is listed on the New South Wales Threatened Species Act 1995, prior to its taxonomic split from Myotis adversus.

A decline in water quality and increased urbanisation have been linked to M. macropus exclusion from aquatic habitats. The species has been identified as vulnerable to heavy metal pollution and bioaccumulation.

== Diet ==
Using echolocation, M. macropus forage upon aquatic and terrestrial prey. Analysis of their scat has found their diet to consist of a wide range of taxa. Among these are fishes, Hymenoptera, Chironominae (non-biting midges), Culicidae (mosquitoes), Lepidoptera (primarily moths), Coleoptera, Notonectidae and Corixidae (water boatmen).

== Behaviour and reproduction ==
=== Echolocation and vocalisations ===
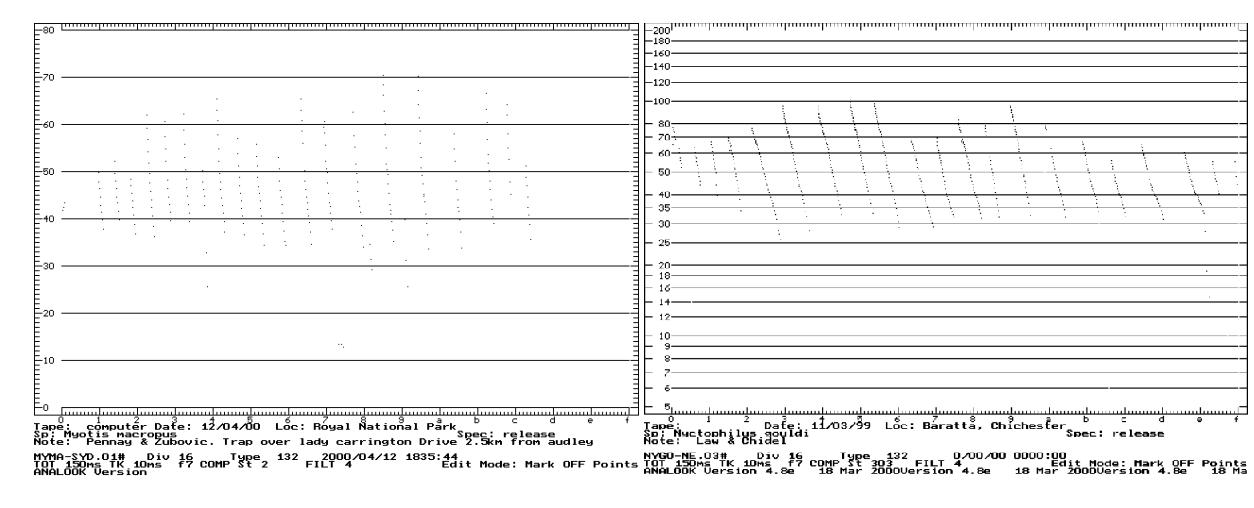
A comparison of Myotis macropus call (left) and Nyctophilus gouldi call (right)

M. macropus has an unusually linear call. The starting frequency of the call is between 70 and 80 kHz before dropping to between 35 and 40 kHz. Complete calls have a "kink" halfway through at approximately 50 kHz, which often reoccurs before the call is terminated. The call of the M. macropus is similar to that of Nyctophilus, leading to confusion. Unlike other echolocating bats, there is little to no regional variation in terms of their call.
