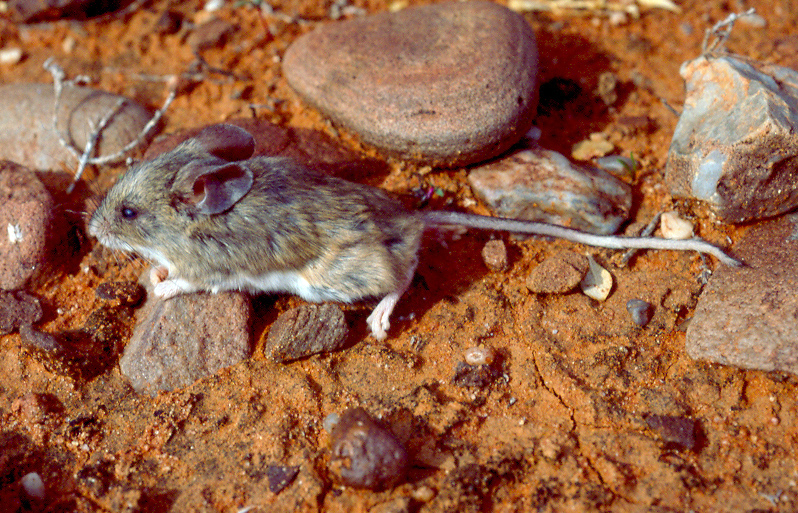

Conservation status
- Least Concern (IUCN 3.1)

Scientific classification
- Kingdom: Animalia
- Phylum: Chordata
- Class: Mammalia
- Infraclass: Placentalia
- Order: Rodentia
- Family: Muridae
- Genus: Pseudomys
- Species: P. bolami

Binomial name
- Pseudomys bolami (Troughton, 1932)
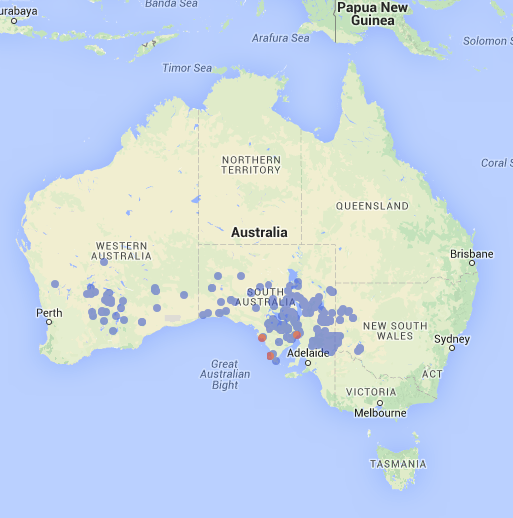
- Distribution of Bolam's mouse in Australia

= Bolam's mouse =

Species of rodent

Bolam's mouse (Pseudomys bolami) is a species of nocturnal, burrowing rodent in the family Muridae that inhabits the semi arid and southern arid regions of Australia. It has a number of physiological and behavioural adaptations developed to cope with an extremely varied climate. These include the ability to survive by extracting water from seeds alone, the production of highly concentrated urine, low water content faeces and nocturnal activity.

== Description ==
Bolam's mouse is the size of a house mouse although slimmer in appearance with larger eyes, feet and ears with a longer tail. It is also quieter than a house mouse when handled and lacks a musty odour. Other distinguishing features include the absence of notched upper incisors which are characteristic of the house mouse. The weight of males and females is between 9 and 16 grams (0.32 and 0.56 oz). The body length is 50–80 millimetres (2.0–3.1 in) with a tail length of 71–103 mm (2.8–4.1 in). The fur is a dull grey-brown that blends from white at the base to much darker at the tips. It is very similar in appearance to the sandy inland mouse, Pseudomys hermannsburgensis, but with a longer hindfoot (18.4–20.1 mm (0.72–0.79 in)), 4–6 hairs per tail scale and longer ears (15.2–18.6 mm (0.60–0.73 in)).

== Taxonomy ==
Bolam's mouse was first described by Troughton in 1932 as a subspecies of the sandy inland mouse, as Pseudomys hermannsburgensis bolami. It was reclassified as a separate species by Kitchener et al. in 1984 based on nucleic acid electrophoretic and morphometric characters.

== Distribution ==
It has a wide distribution that ranges from south west Western Australia through South Australia to south western New South Wales. The range of the species has declined in recent times with the species no longer found in the Sunset region of South Australia and Victoria. Fossil evidence shows that its range has also contracted in New South Wales where it formerly occupied much of the west of the state including Mutawintji National Park in the north west. The range of Bolam's mouse is generally south of that of the sandy inland mouse with very little overlap in distribution.

== Diet ==
Bolam's mouse is an omnivorous rodent that feeds on a mixture of seed, plant material, invertebrates and fungus. Due to the high variability of food resources available to P. bolami its diet is seasonally varied. Generally seeds particularly those of Maireana astrotricha occupy the majority of the diet when conditions are suitable for seed production. Plant material including leaves, floral material, stems and roots generally make up more than 30% of the diet. Invertebrates make up more than 10% of the diet and fungus makes up less than 1%.

== Life Cycle ==
Bolam's mouse has been recorded breeding in all seasons but typically breeds in spring and early summer to coincide with available food resources. It has also been observed to have an opportunistic breeding pattern that peaks with an elevenfold increase in numbers 12 months after a significant rainfall event to exploit additional food resources. Individuals are sexually mature when a body mass of 9 grams (0.32 oz) is reached. Females can have 4–6 offspring. The estimated life span of Bolam's mouse is as low as two years.

== Habitat ==
It is found in a range of vegetation communities within the arid and semi-arid regions of Australia. These communities range from Mallee-spinifex, Mallee-Shrubland, Belah woodland, mixed open shrubland/woodland, chenopod shrubland plains and Acacia/Eucalyptus woodlands.

They are found to inhabit areas that have loamy, clay, gravelly, sandy or calcareous soils where they are able to burrow. They also occupy vacant goanna, bettong and rabbit burrows and underneath fallen timber.

== Threats ==
There has been a contraction in the geographical range of Bolam's mouse in recent times, with regional extinctions in areas where there is significant land clearing for agriculture such as the Eyre Peninsula and the sunset region of South Australia and north west Victoria. The clearing of vegetation particularly that of Maireana species removes not only a valuable food source but also microhabitats and cover from predators. Predation by introduced predators such as foxes (Vulpes vulpes) and cats (Felis catus) has also been observed throughout the arid and semi-arid regions of Australia resulting in a reduction in the numbers of many species including Bolam's mouse.

== Conservation status ==
In New South Wales, Bolam's mouse is listed as endangered under Schedule 1 of the Threatened Species Conservation Act 1995 and is extant in south-western New South Wales. In Victoria, the species is presumed extinct. Nationally, the conservation status of the species is listed as least concerned by the IUCN "in view of its wide distribution, presumed large population, occurrence in a number of protected areas, lack of major threats, and because it is unlikely to be declining at nearly the rate required to qualify for listing in a threatened category".
