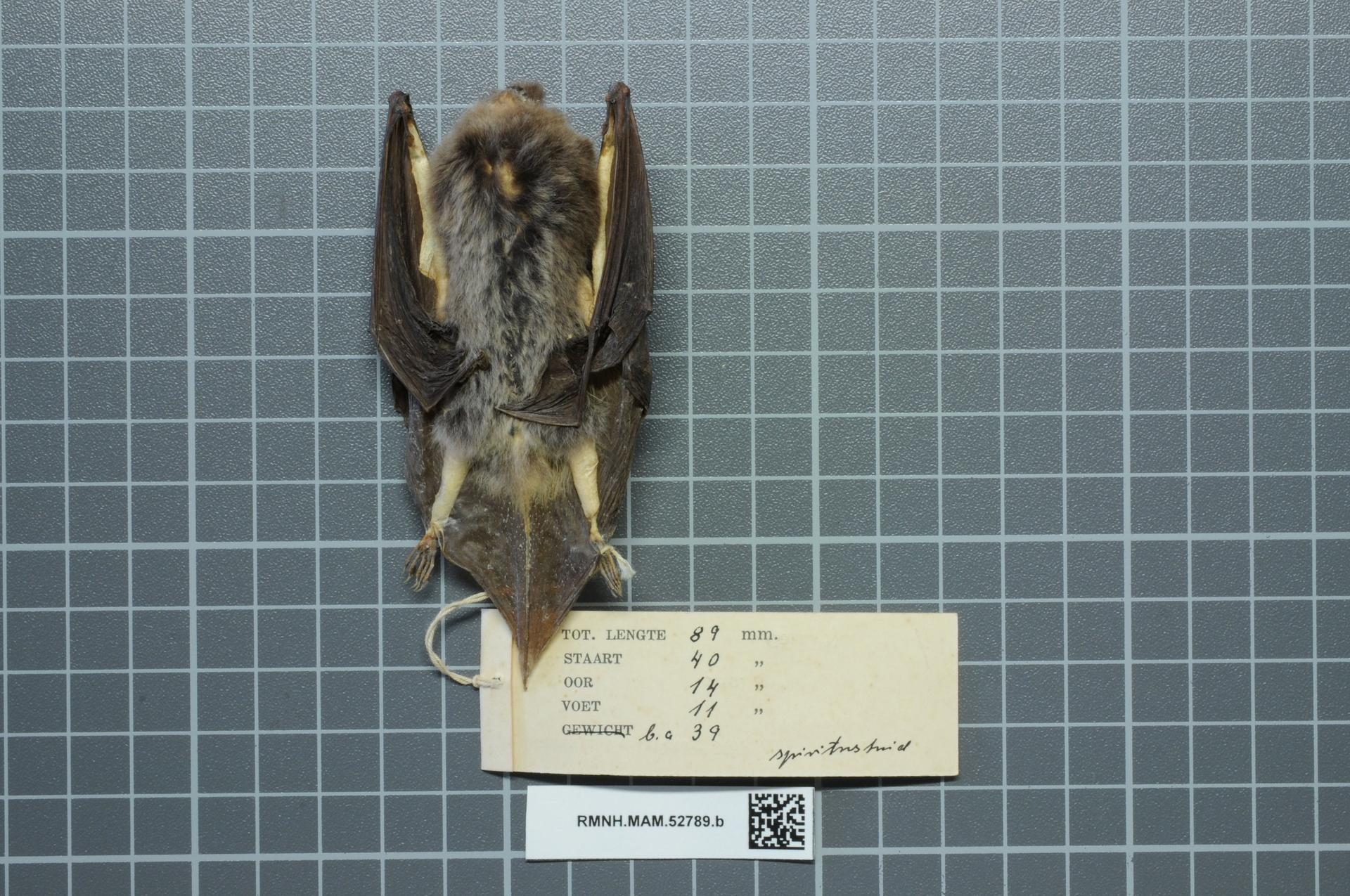

Conservation status
- Least Concern (IUCN 3.1)

Scientific classification
- Kingdom: Animalia
- Phylum: Chordata
- Class: Mammalia
- Order: Chiroptera
- Family: Vespertilionidae
- Genus: Myotis
- Species: M. adversus

Binomial name
- Myotis adversus Horsfield, 1824
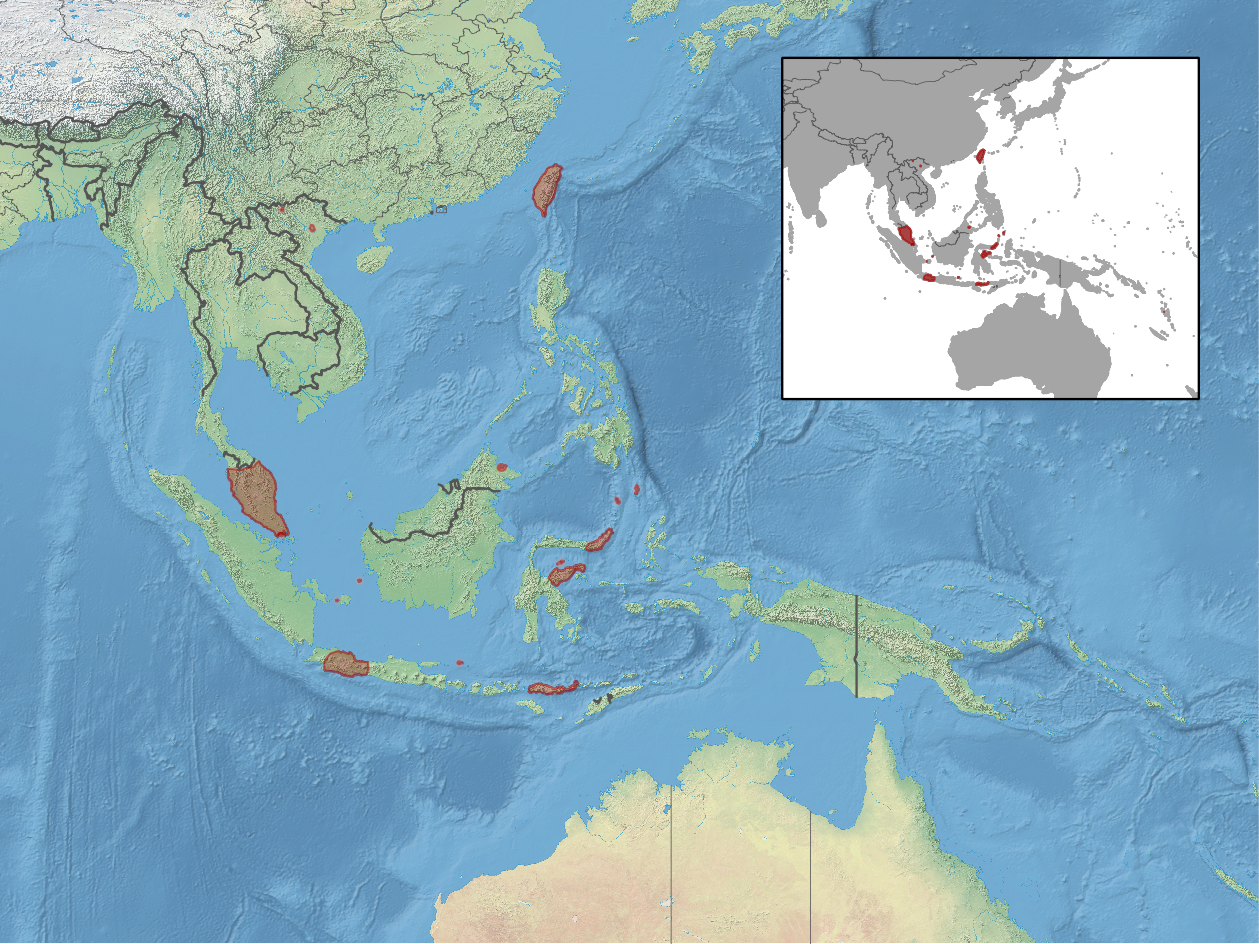

= Large-footed bat =

Species of bat

The large-footed bat, large-footed mouse-eared bat or large-footed myotis (Myotis adversus) is a species of vesper bat (family Vespertilionidae). It can be found in the following countries: Australia, Indonesia, Malaysia, Papua New Guinea, Singapore, Solomon Islands, Taiwan, Vanuatu, and possibly Vietnam.
