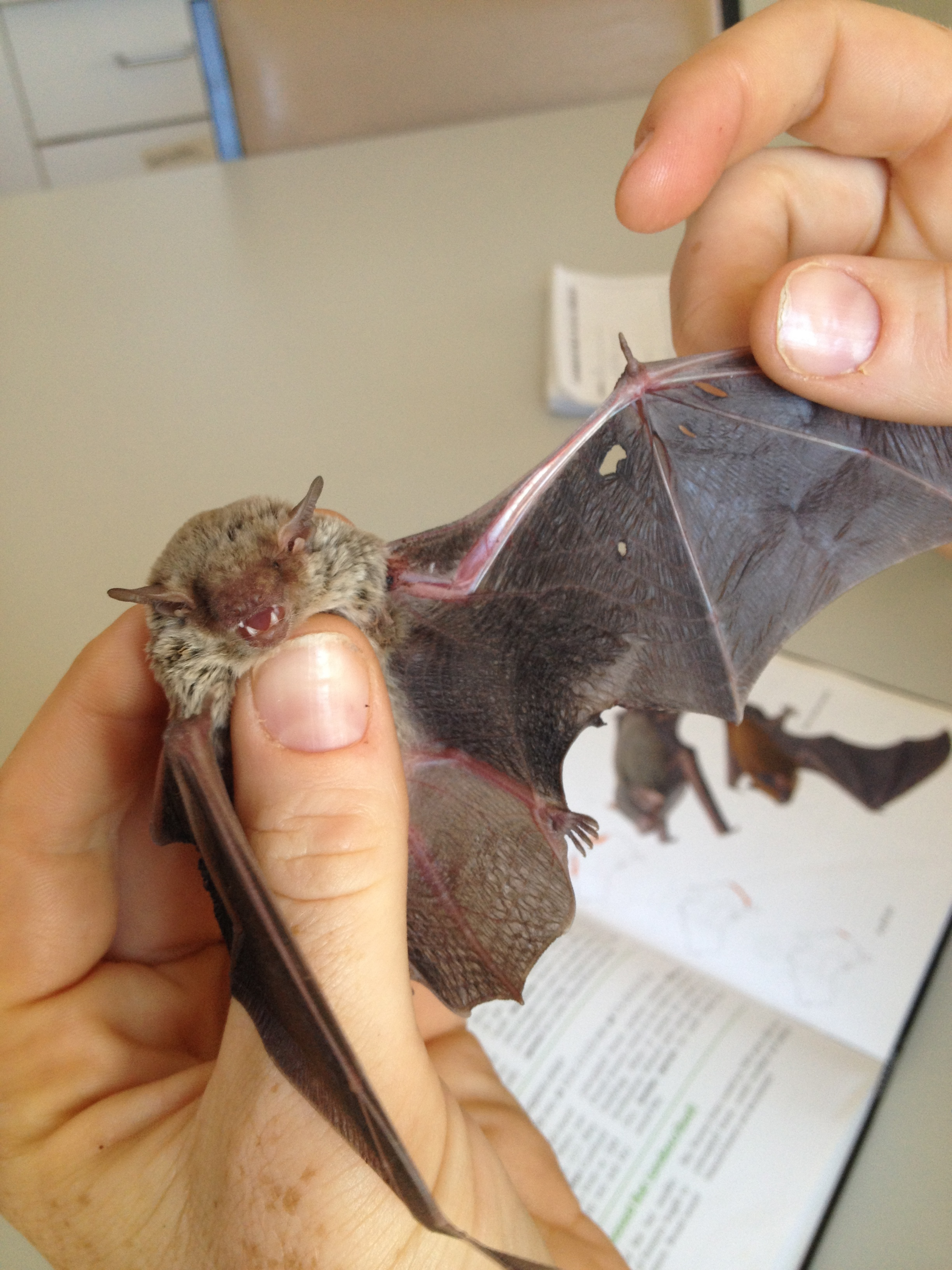
- being held with outstretched wing. Found roosting inside a house at Roxby Downs, South Australia.

Conservation status
- Least Concern (IUCN 3.1)

Scientific classification
- Kingdom: Animalia
- Phylum: Chordata
- Class: Mammalia
- Order: Chiroptera
- Family: Vespertilionidae
- Genus: Scotorepens
- Species: S. balstoni

Binomial name
- Scotorepens balstoni (Thomas, 1906)
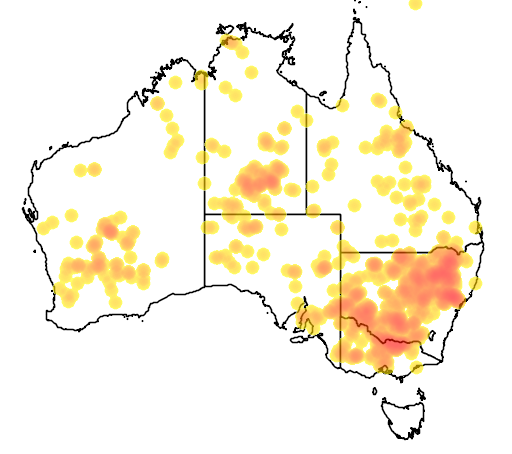
- Map showing recorded occurrences of inland broad-nosed bats. Source: Atlas of Living Australia

= Inland broad-nosed bat =

Species of bat

The inland broad-nosed bat (Scotorepens balstoni) is a species of vesper bat. They are endemic to Australia and widespread throughout the inland, especially in arid and semi-arid regions. This insectivorous microbat, measuring 12 centimetres (4.7 in) in length, roosts in tree hollows during the day and forages over woodland and water at night.

== Description ==
The inland broad-nosed bat is a moderate-sized species of microbat. It features a characteristic broad square-shaped muzzle when viewed from above that is formed by swollen, glandular pads. The fur colour of the species can vary from dark brown to a pale sand colour, with light grey-brown on the back and pale brown on the belly being most common . This species along with other broad-nosed bats have short slender ears, small eyes, a tail enclosed in the uropatagium membrane and only one upper incisor on each side. Unique to male inland broad-nosed bats are the numerous spines on the glans penis, with up to 22 spines on the head in two long rows. Body measurements, especially forearm length, along with distribution are useful in identifying the species. The species can also be identified by its short tragus of 4 millimetres (0.16 in). Male inland broad-nosed bats tend to be slightly smaller than females.

Table 1. Measurements important for identification purposes

| | Weight | Forearm length | Ear length | Tail length | Wingspan |
|---|---|---|---|---|---|
| Average | 9.3 g | 36 mm | 13 mm | 36 mm | 278 mm |
| Range | 6-14 g | 32–41 mm | 11–14 mm | 29–42 mm | 252–295 mm |

The species has characteristic echolocation frequencies of 34.1 - 38.7 kHz in WA and 28 –34 kHz in NSW.

== Taxonomy ==
Scotorepens balstoni (pronounced skoh′-toh-rep′-enz bawl′-stun-ee) translates to mean 'Balton's darkness creeper'.

There are several synonyms existing for this species which include:

- Nycticeius balstoni (Thomas, 1906)
- Scoteinus balstoni (Thomas, 1906)
- Nycticeius influatus (Thomas, 1924)
- Scoteinus influatus (Thomas, 1924)
- Scoteinus balstoni caprenus

Research evidence indicates that Scotorepens balstoni may be a 'composite of several distinct species' creating the need for a 'comprehensive taxonomic assessment' of the species. Due to similarities in appearance Scotorepens balstoni is most likely to be confused with the other species of small broad-nosed bats (Scotorepens): S. greyii, S. orion, S. sanborni and S. sp..

== Distribution and habitat ==
Inland broad-nosed bats are distributed widely throughout inland Australia, including arid and semi-arid regions. They are generally not distributed east of the Great Dividing Range.

In Western Australia distribution covers the northern wheatbelt, the south-western interzone, the Murchison region, the Gibson desert and the Great Victoria desert. In the Western Australian rangelands the species shows preference for Mulga woodland, while also choosing to inhabit Salmon Gum/Gimlet and York Gum woodlands. In the semi-arid Mallee region of north-western Victoria inland broad-nosed bats show a preference for open woodland and dryland woodland habitats. Other known occurrences in semi-arid regions in New South Wales are at Willundra Lakes and Kinchega National Park, along with Dangalli in South Australia. In South Australia distribution in arid areas indicates a habitat preference for river red gums following surface drainage systems.

== Behaviour ==
=== Roost habits ===
Inland broad-nosed bats prefer to roost in tree hollows, in groups of up to 45 individuals. Roosting also occurs in the roofs of buildings, under metal caps of power poles and in water pipes. They often roost horizontally. The species has been known to share roosts with colonies of south-eastern freetail bats (Mormopterus sp.).

=== Diet and foraging ===
Inland broad-nosed bats are described as air-superiority insectivores. In northern distribution areas they are known to eat cockroaches, termites, crickets, cicadas, bugs, beetles, flies, moths and ants. In Victoria their diet consists mostly of beetles, ants, bugs, moths, flies and grasshoppers. They start foraging earlier than most other species, beginning usually just on dusk. Foraging is achieved using echolocation whilst in continuous flight, keeping within 15 metres of the ground, with rapid diversions to pursue prey. Foraging mainly occurs between trees, not going above the tree canopy, as well as at the edges of forests venturing into open areas. Speeds during flight have been measured between 12–21 km/h (7.5–13.0 mph). Flight efficiency is a result of the species having a streamlined head shape, silky fur texture and small manoeuvre-enhancing shaped ears.

=== Reproduction ===
Within the southern distribution, mating occurs around April–May with single young or twins born mid-November In the northern distribution areas, mating occurs in September with often twins being born although triplets have been recorded. The young are born well developed and without fur. Newborns use recurved milk teeth to secure themselves to their mother. When the young are around 12 days old their milk teeth are replaced by permanent dentition. The young remain attached to the mother until they are 10 days old and are vocal when not suckling. By this stage they weigh around 4 grams and are then left behind in the roost when the mother forages at night. Their development progresses with eyes opening and fur growing by the time they are 15 days old. After 30 days they are exercising their wings and then go on to forage independently.

== Arid and semi-arid area adaptions ==
Foraging locations in the drier distribution areas appear to depend on nearness to water points and roosting sites In arid areas inland broad-nosed bats possibly obtain water from the insects eaten and further conserve water by producing concentrated urine in specialized kidneys. In semi-arid areas foraging is concentrated around water sources with drinking occurring during flight. Similar to other arid zone mammals it is likely, especially in southern distribution areas, that the inland broad-nosed bat is able to enter into prolonged periods of torpor, reducing energy and water requirements, Another arid and semi-arid adaption is the ability to tolerate high body temperatures.

== Conservation ==
Inland broad-nosed bats are a common species but are decreasing in population (Pennay & Lumsden 2008). The 'wide distribution, large population and occurrence in a number of protected areas' places this species within the IUCN Red List category of least concern (Pennay & Lumsden 2008). Further research is needed to identify the specific threats to this species (Pennay & Lumsden 2008). Likely threats to roosting sites and feeding grounds include agricultural and forestry activity, clearing for housing, modified fire regimes that eliminate trees with hollows and local removal of access to roosting sites. Researchers or wildlife rescuers should be aware that the species are known to be aggressive and their strong jaws deliver a painful bite. Due to their aggressive nature it is also advisable to carry and house them separately to other species
