= Darrell Kitchener =

Australian zoologist

Darrell John Kitchener (born 1943) is an Australian biologist who has been active in mammalian research in Western Australia and Indonesia.

Kitchener is the author of over one hundred papers, published while employed as the senior research biologist at the Western Australian Museum, and described many new species of mammals during his 28 years in that position. Kitchener was born on 9 June 1943 in Victoria, Australia. He obtained degrees in botany and zoological sciences at the University of Tasmania and completed his Ph.D. at the University of Western Australia. His works include contributions to the Australian Museum's Complete book of Australian mammals.

The specific epithet for the free-tailed bat Mormopterus kitcheneri — found in the Southwest Australia ecoregion and first described in 2014 — commemorates Kitchener "for his prolific contribution to elucidating the systematics of Indo-Australian mammals, especially bats".
