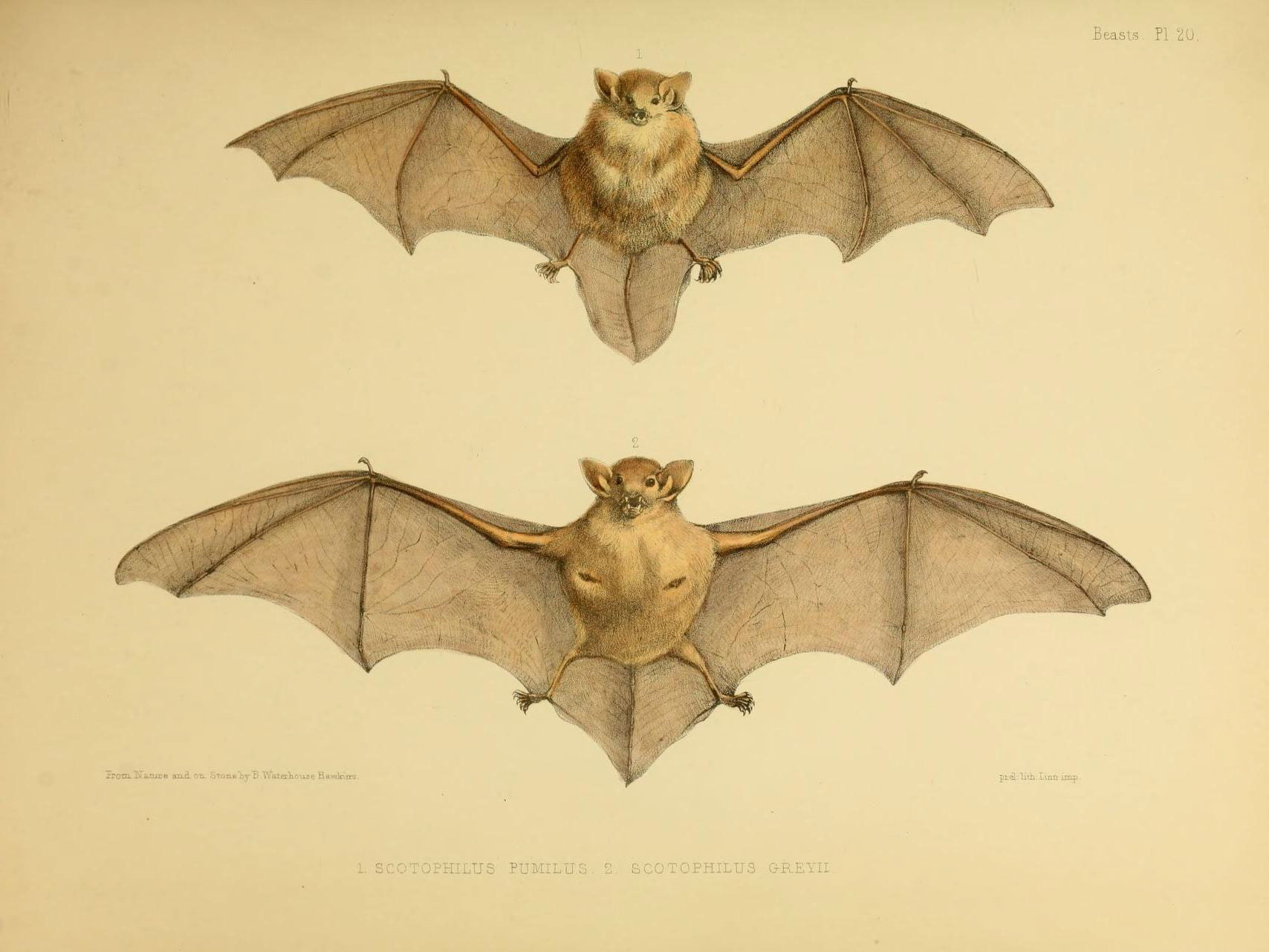

Conservation status
- Least Concern (IUCN 3.1)

Scientific classification
- Kingdom: Animalia
- Phylum: Chordata
- Class: Mammalia
- Order: Chiroptera
- Family: Vespertilionidae
- Genus: Vespadelus
- Species: V. pumilus

Binomial name
- Vespadelus pumilus Gray, 1841

Synonyms
- Eptesicus pumilus Gray, 1841

= Eastern forest bat =

Species of bat

The eastern forest bat (Vespadelus pumilus) is a species of vesper bat in the family Vespertilionidae. It is found only in Australia, where it has been recorded from Queensland to New South Wales. The population is in decline, with the number of mature individuals decreasing.
