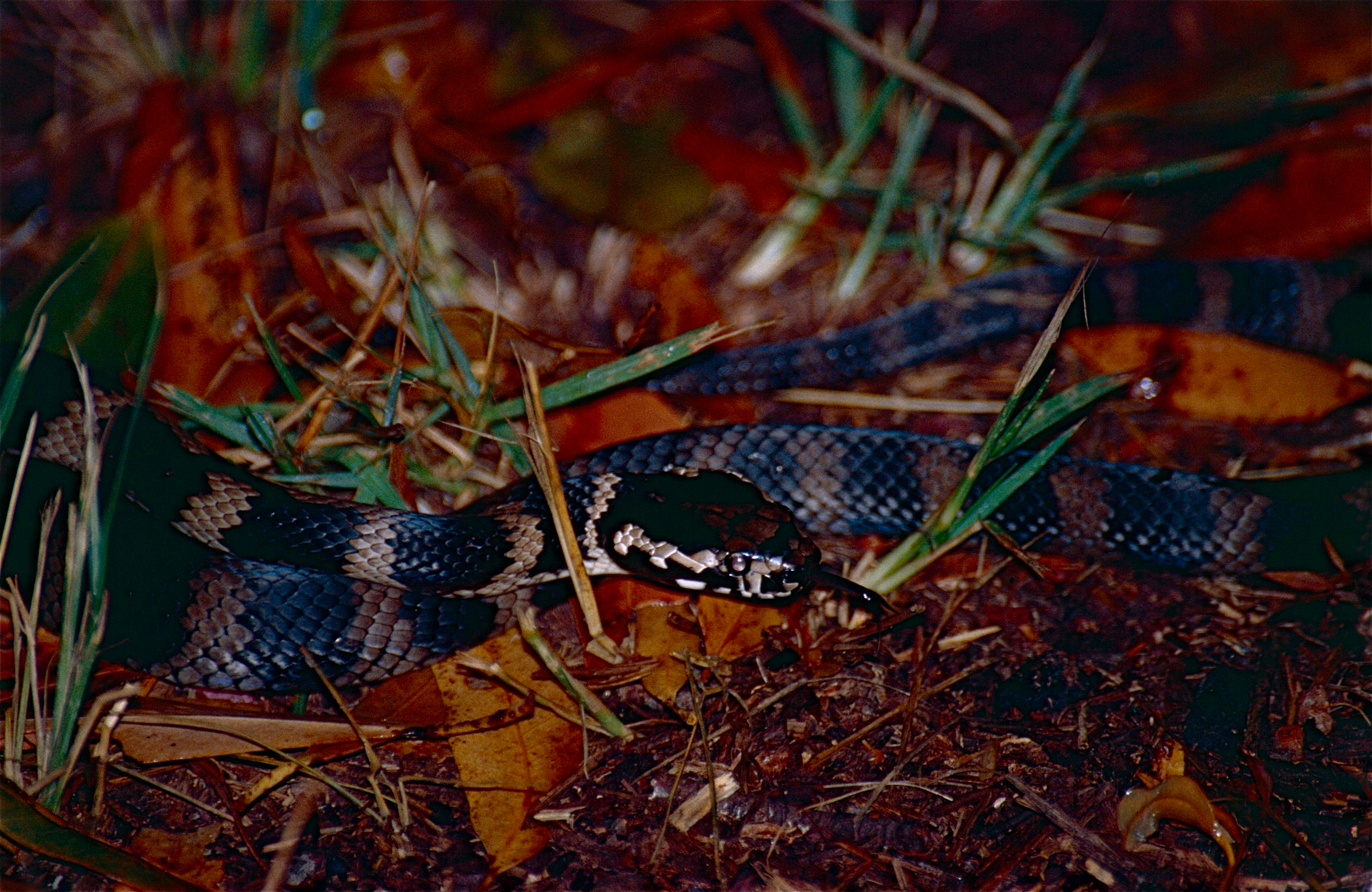

Conservation status
- Near Threatened (IUCN 3.1)

Scientific classification
- Kingdom: Animalia
- Phylum: Chordata
- Class: Reptilia
- Order: Squamata
- Suborder: Serpentes
- Family: Elapidae
- Genus: Hoplocephalus
- Species: H. stephensii

Binomial name
- Hoplocephalus stephensii Krefft, 1869

= Stephens's banded snake =

Hoplocephalus stephensii

Species of snake

Stephens's banded snake (Hoplocephalus stephensii) is a species of highly venomous tree snake in the family Elapidae. The species is endemic to Australia.

== Taxonomy ==
Gerard Krefft described Hoplocephalus stephensii as a species new to science in 1869. The specific name stephensii, is in honour of Australian academic William John Stephens.

== Description ==
H. stephensii grows up to 1 meter (39 inches) in total length (including tail), with some specimens having been recorded as having a total length upwards of 120 cm (47 in). The Stephens' banded snake is the largest species within the genus Hoplocephalus, weighing up to 250 g (8.8 oz) as an adult. On average, females of this species are larger than males. This slight sexual dimorphism is an adaptation that likely improves the reproductive capabilities of females.

The anterior scalation of Stephens's banded snake consists of 21 rows of midbody dorsal scales, and 220 to 250 ventral scales. Posteriorly, its singular subcaudal scales can range between 50 and 70 scales from the anal plate to the tip of the tail. This species has a singular (undivided) anal plate that covers its cloacal opening. The ventral scales of the genus Hoplocephalus differ from other elapids as they have lateral notches along the caudal border of each of these scales. This adaptation aids with gripping onto branches whilst climbing. Additionally, the occipital scales on the head of this snake are elongated.

The body of the Stephens's banded snake is adorned with alternating grey or black and dirty-white bands of colouration on the dorsal side of the snake. These snakes may have over 40 of each colour band from the back of the head to the tip of the tail. Whilst the flat and quadrangular belly of the snake is mostly dirty-white with occasional splotches of grey towards the head and tail end of the snake. The top of this species' head is typically dark brown in colouration, and it has pale blotches or bars of patterning along the lips.

The morphological composition of a slender body and broadened arrow-shaped head also allows for more agile locomotion in an arboreal habitat whilst also having the capability of predating on a large range of species within the ecosystem. This unique body plan essentially reduces metabolic costs, allowing the snake to retain energy for longer periods of time.

== Distribution and habitat ==
The Stephens's banded snake is endemic to the east coast of Australia. The distribution of this snake spans from its northern most range in the Kroombit tops of south-eastern Queensland down to the Gosford Area of New South Wales. Within this coastal range, the species is typically restricted to high-rainfall remnant forest regions, secluded from human intervention. The Stephens's banded snake can be found up to an altitude of 950 m (3,120 ft) above sea level within its geographical range. Studies on the habitat preferences of this species have found that it prefers to reside around 20 m (66 ft) high in canopy trees.

H. stephensii has a broad tolerance for variations in abiotic and biotic factors such as vegetal communities and climatic changes within the constraints of its remnant forest habitats. The species will favour areas with less rugged terrain as well as hollow bearing trees, dense understory vegetation or rocky outcrops that it may utilise to seek refuge.

Individual male Stephens's banded snakes occupy an average home range of 20.2 hectares (49.9 acres). Whilst the females of the species have a much smaller average home range of 5.4 hectares (13.3 acres). This difference is likely due to the fact that males may venture out of their typical territories in order to find a viable mate.

== Behavior ==
Stephens's banded snake has been described as having a nervous and defensive temperament towards other animals. This species of snake is a relatively solitary animal, only voluntarily interacting with other individuals of the same species during mating season, in which males will actively pursue females to reproduce. If females are apprehensive to reproduce upon the pursuit of potential mates, they may assume a stereotypical posture that is used to prevent males from engaging in copulation. The female will form a tight coil with its body, with its vent in the centre coil, out of reach from the male.

Stephens's banded snake is one of the few predominantly arboreal elapid species in Australia. Other Australian elapidae that exhibit similar arboreality include the broad-headed snake and the pale-headed snake, both of which belong to the genus Hoplocephalus. Stephens's banded snake is also capable of living a terrestrial lifestyle depending on the available resources in its environment. The species is nocturnal; thus, it spends a large portion of the day sequestering in the canopy tree hollows within the mesic forests in which it resides. The Stephens's banded snake displays significant reluctance with its heliothermic behaviours. Due to its small size it is at risk of predation. Therefore, this snake will spend minimal time basking amongst the branches of trees. Typically, it is semi-covered by foliage so as to offer some means of concealment whilst in this vulnerable position. A study on the basking behaviours of H. stephensii has revealed that the species only prefers to overtly bask when it is either in late stages of pregnancy, has just fed, or is in the process of undergoing ecdysis.

Throughout the winter season, Stephens's banded snake stops feeding and undergoes brumation in the protection of a tree hollow for up to five months. During this period of time, its metabolism is significantly slowed, allowing it to conserve energy. Being cold blooded, it is only able to resume digestive processes when temperatures rise again in its environment. Studies on the survivable temperature threshold of this snake have revealed that its body temperatures may fluctuate anywhere between 11.1 °C (52 °F) to 37.8 °C (100 °F) depending on the climatic conditions. The typical diurnal body temperature of this snake species averages at 28.4 °C (83 °F).

The species is at its most active in its natural habitat in the months of September to May. Stephens's banded snake is highly vagile and may use up to 30 different trees within its range. Territories of individuals may overlap. Despite this, it avoids conspecific encounters.

== Life cycle ==
Studies suggest that Stephens's banded snake evolved to live a low energy and slow life cycle in response to limited food availability and low temperatures along the snake's geographical range. Males of the species only reach sexual maturity at three years of age, whilst females may only reach sexual maturity after four years. In addition, individual females are only gravid every two years and give birth to relatively small litters in comparison to other Australian elapids. Through observations of captive Stephens's banded snakes, scientists were able to note that the species engaged in reproductive behaviours during the spring season. Stephens's banded snake is viviparous, and the species has been recorded to have anywhere between one and nine offspring per litter. In wild populations the average generational length for Stephens's banded snake is eight years.

== Diet ==
Stephens's banded snake is a nocturnal predator. It is an infrequent feeder and has a generalist approach to hunting methods. By implementing a combination of active searching and ambush strategies, it is able to obtain a wide range of prey including frogs, small lizards, bush rats, mice and pygmy possums. Studies have observed that H. stephensii prefers to inhabit tree hollows that are frequented by small mammalians, oftentimes coiling amongst rodent nests waiting for its potential prey to return.

Prey options within the habitat of Stephens's banded snake vary on a seasonal basis. The small size of this snake means that it is unable to feed on the adult variants of most prey species. Instead, it seasonally hunts juveniles of different animals throughout the year as its limited mouth gape prevents it from predating on larger prey.

The neonatal size of this species is large compared to other juvenile elapids, measuring an average total length (including tail) of 25 cm (9.8 in). This large size is advantageous at a young age as a neonate is readily capable of consuming a wider variety of species including small ectotherms and rodents that live in its resource poor environment.

== Venom ==
The Stephens's banded snake has been described as a ready biter with its subsequent envenoming being potentially fatal. The venom of H. stephensii is a procoagulant and has typically been described as exhibiting a defibrination-type coagulopathy in patients. Therefore, envenomation will result in a reaction known as venom-induced consumption coagulopathy (VICC). Systemic symptoms of VICC include nausea, headache, abdominal pain, vomiting and diarrhoea as well as diaphoresis. The venom contains prothrombinase, a complex that prompts the production of the thrombin enzyme in the blood. This enzymatic reaction induces micro clotting in the bloodstream of its victims. Effectually, this blocks the flow of blood throughout the body. If left untreated, the clotting will cause blood vessels to rupture. Consequentially, the envenomated victim will experience excessive bleeding.

Presently, no anti-venom has been derived from the venom of the Stephens's banded snake. Despite this, it has been documented that victims of this snake's envenomation have been successfully treated using up to 4 doses of 3,000 unit tiger snake anti-venom. Despite the lethality of the venom of H. stephensii, there has only been one recorded fatality of its envenomation. The victim of this fatal encounter was an elderly man in his 60s from the town of Kalang in New South Wales. Due to torrential rain and flood conditions, a team of SES, ambulance and police rescue worked together to reach and transport the wounded man to John Hunter Hospital. However, medical assistance was unable to remediate him in time.

== Genetics ==
Genetic research pertaining to the molecular phylogeny of the genus Hoplocephalus has revealed that Stephens's banded snake displays up to 2.6–3.1% in genetic divergence with the broad-headed snake (H. bungaroides), making these two coastal species the most closely related within the genus. Whereas, the pale-headed snake (H. bitorquatus), a more inland relative, genetically diverges up to 7.8–8.3% with Stephens' banded snake. H. stephensii displays low genetic diversity amongst extant populations. Wild populations of the species exhibit 9 different mitochondrial haplotypes. Within individual populations, it may exhibit anywhere between 1 and 3 haplotypes with single base pairing differences. Throughout the entire wild population of Stephens's banded snake, the largest genetic divergence has been observed between the far north and far south populations with a 1.7% sequence divergence. Through genetic analysis, scientists have determined that these populations of Stephens' banded snake separated from each other approximately 850,000 years ago.

== Threats and conservation ==
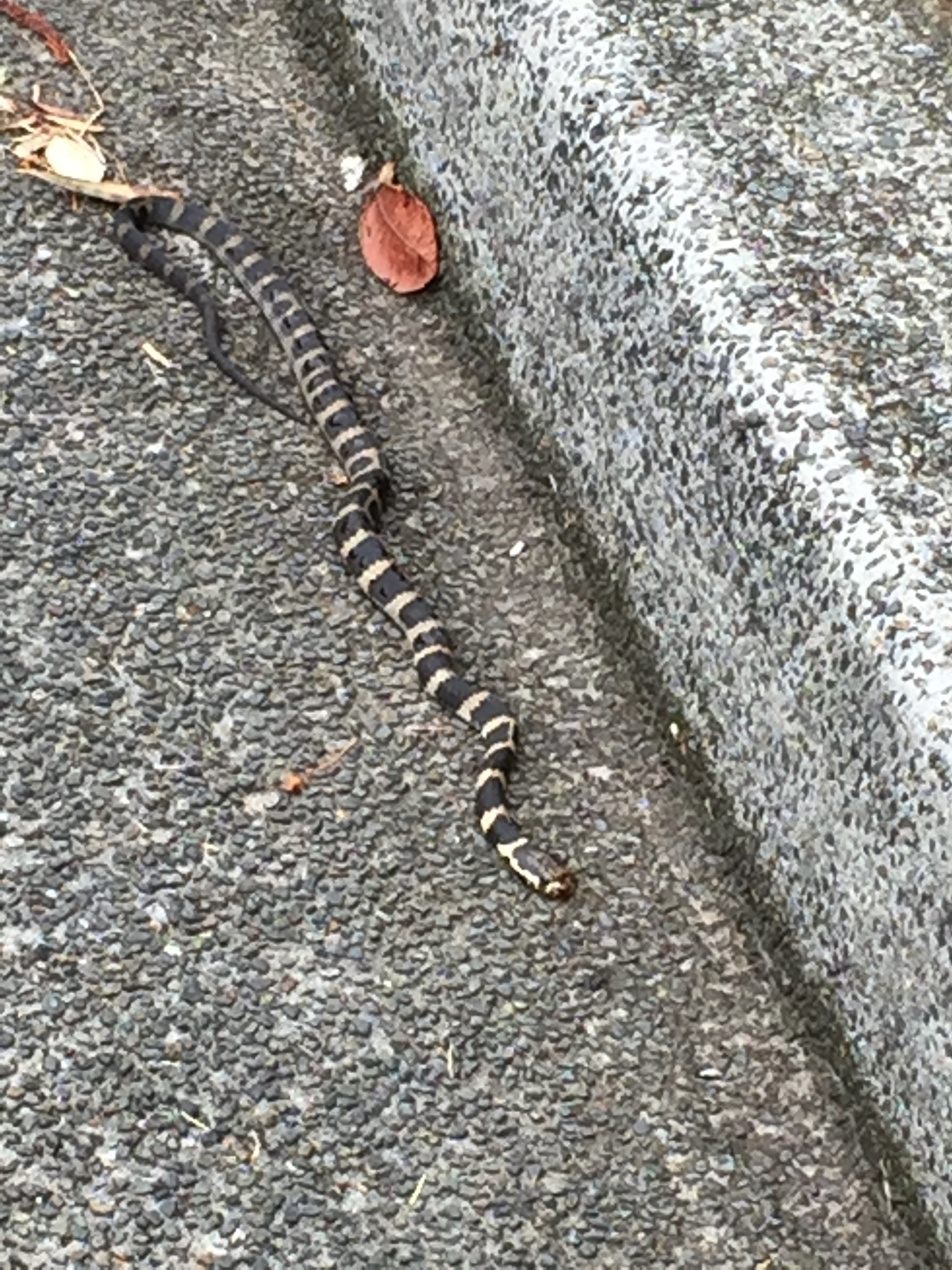
Stephens's banded snake on roadside.

Stephens's banded snake is listed as near threatened in the IUCN Red List. In the last 200 years since the onset of European colonisation in Australia, this species has experienced a steady decline in population. Scientists have been able to use radiometric tracking technology in order to study the movement patterns of Stephens's banded snake throughout its natural habitat. These studies have suggested that the declining populations of the species is primarily due to habitat fragmentation coupled with a low fecundity and growth rate. This is a result of anthropogenic disturbances such as deforestation and habitat encroachment by urban developments as well as livestock farming. Due to the rarity of this snake, the illegal capturing of wild specimens for commercial use has proven to be detrimental to the survivability of these wild populations. In addition, invasive species have also introduced zoonotic diseases and increased competition for resources.

In an effort to maintain the survivability of Stephens's banded snake, the NSW government has registered this species under the landscape management section of the "Saving Our Species" program, by way of the Biodiversity Conservation Act of 2016 No. 63. This was done in order to establish a recovery strategy to reconnect and revegetate the species' fragmented habitats.

== Captivity ==
The New South Wales government permits the private ownership of H. stephensii. The NSW Native Animal Keepers Species List of 2016 specifies that individuals need to register with the Department of Planning, Industry and Environment in order to acquire either a R3, R4 or R5 Level license. In order to obtain this level of licensing for the legal ownership of Stephens's banded snake, keepers must provide proof of a first-aid certificate, an escape proof enclosure, a lockable room, an emergency response plan as well as references that confirm the applicant's experience and skills in handling venomous reptiles.

Ex situ observations of this species have revealed that Stephens's banded snake, when kept in captivity, can potentially grow larger and reproduce more rapidly than its wild counterparts as a result of consistent food availability.
