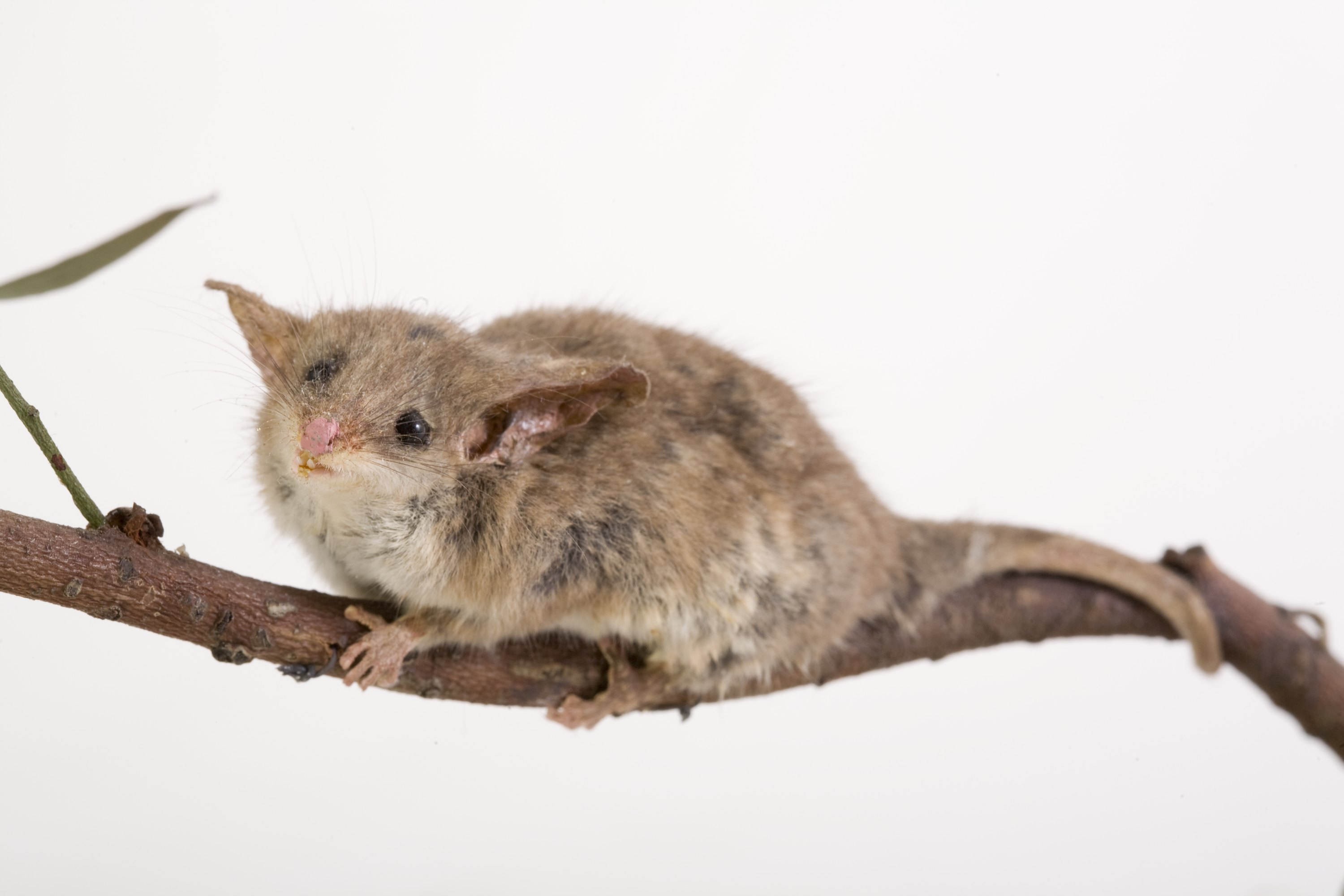

Conservation status
- Least Concern (IUCN 3.1)

Scientific classification
- Kingdom: Animalia
- Phylum: Chordata
- Class: Mammalia
- Infraclass: Marsupialia
- Order: Diprotodontia
- Family: Burramyidae
- Genus: Cercartetus
- Species: C. lepidus

Binomial name
- Cercartetus lepidus (Thomas, 1888)
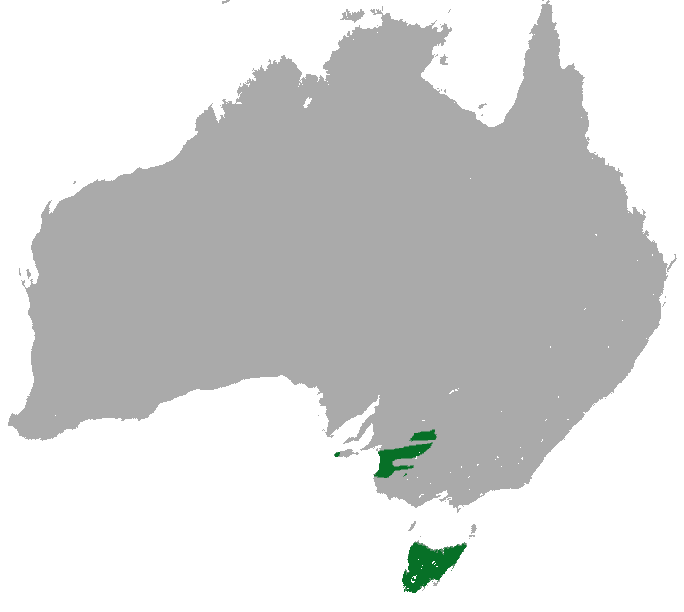
- Tasmanian pygmy possum range

= Tasmanian pygmy possum =

Species of marsupial

The Tasmanian pygmy possum (Cercartetus lepidus), also known as the little pygmy possum or tiny pygmy possum, is the world's smallest possum. It was first described by Oldfield Thomas in 1888, after he identified that a museum specimen labelled as an eastern pygmy possum in fact represented a species then unknown to science. The holotype resides in the Natural History Museum in London.

== Description ==
Although it is a marsupial, the Tasmanian pygmy possum superficially resembles a dormouse, and it is the smallest of all the known species of possum. Adults range from 6.6 to 7.5 centimetres (2.6 to 3.0 in) in head-body length, with a 6 to 7.2 centimetres (2.4 to 2.8 in) tail, and weigh just 7 to 10 grams (0.25 to 0.35 oz). Their fur is soft and thick, and is fawn in colour over most of the body, fading to a pale grey on the underparts.

The snout is short with long whiskers, and the eyes are directed forwards and surrounded by slightly darker fur, although without the conspicuous black rings seen on other pygmy possums. The ears are mobile and largely hairless. The tail is prehensile, and thickly furred at the base, which may be widened by fat stores beneath the skin. The remainder of the tail is relatively narrow and cylindrical, with only sparse hair between numerous tiny scales.

== Distribution and habitat ==
The Tasmanian pygmy possum is found throughout Tasmania, but was at one time thought to be extinct elsewhere. In 1964, a living animal was discovered on Kangaroo Island in South Australia, and further populations have since been discovered in the Murray-Darling basin in South Australia and Victoria. There are no formally recognised subspecies, although it has been proposed, based on genetic information, that the mainland and Tasmanian populations may be subspecies, or even entirely separate species. They inhabit sclerophyll forest, mallee, and open heathland vegetation.

The oldest fossils for this species date from the late Pleistocene, and were found on the mainland, with the oldest known Tasmanian fossils being much younger. Fossils have been found as far afield as eastern Victoria and New South Wales, suggesting that the species was once much more widespread than it is today.

It had been feared that the Kangaroo Island population may have been wiped out by the 2019 bushfires that burnt almost half the island. But in late 2020, conservation group Kangaroo Island Land for Wildlife recorded live pygmy possums in a fauna survey of unburnt forest. A 2026 report revealed that pictures captured in 2006 in the Dhilba Guuranda–Innes National Park, located in the Yorke Peninsula of South Australia, may show two individuals. The journal Australian Zoologist noted that if true, the discovery would be very significant, as the species was previously not known to inhabit the area.

== Behaviour ==
The Tasmanian pygmy possum is nocturnal and arboreal. It lives primarily in shrubland or forest undergrowth, and, although a good climber, rarely ventures into the higher branches of trees, presumably because this would make it more vulnerable to avian predators. Pygmy possums use strips of bark to construct dome-like nests in tree cavities or rotten wood, but are solitary animals that do not share their nests with other individuals except for their own young.

== Biology ==
Tasmanian pygmy possums are omnivorous, feeding on insects, spiders, small lizards, nectar, and pollen, the latter two primarily coming from Banksia and eucalypts. Their preference for eating pollen without destroying the host flower may mean that they help to pollinate some species of plant. Known predators include laughing kookaburras, Australian masked owls, cats, Tasmanian devils, eastern quolls, tiger snakes and possibly southern boobooks and copperheads.

During cold weather, especially below about 6 °C (43 °F), Tasmanian pygmy possums have the ability to enter torpor. While in this state, body temperature drops, and oxygen consumption falls to just 1% of normal.

Breeding occurs throughout the year, although it may be more common in spring and summer. The female has a well-developed pouch containing four teats, which therefore limits the maximum size of a litter to this number. The young leave the pouch at around 42 days, although they may cling to the mother's fur and be carried about after this age. They leave the nest to fend for themselves at around 90 days of age.
