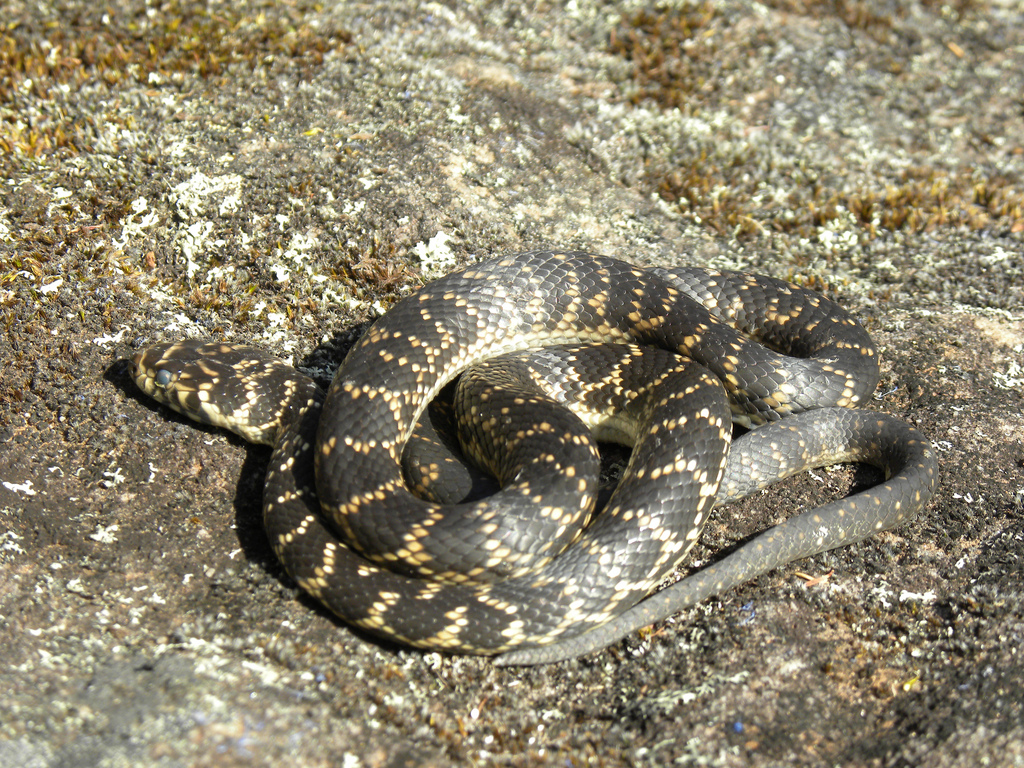
- Hoplocephalus bungaroides

Scientific classification
- Kingdom: Animalia
- Phylum: Chordata
- Class: Reptilia
- Order: Squamata
- Suborder: Serpentes
- Family: Elapidae
- Subfamily: Hydrophiinae
- Genus: Hoplocephalus; Wagler, 1830

= Hoplocephalus =

Genus of snakes

Hoplocephalus is a genus of venomous snakes in the family Elapidae. The genus is endemic to Australia. Three species are recognized.

== Taxonomy ==
The genus name Hoplocephalus was originally coined for the king cobra by Johann Georg Wagler, under the name Hoplocephalus bungaroides (formerly Naja bungaroides). However, the species name Naja bungaroides was used by Hermann Schlegel for the broad-headed snake, and these two names became conflated, with the genus name Hoplocephalus long being used for the Australian snakes instead of the king cobra. This discrepancy was discovered in 2024, but due to the longstanding use of the name, it was decided to maintain the name Hoplocephalus for the Australian snakes and maintain the name H. bungaroides for the broad-headed snake.

== Description ==
Snakes of the genus Hoplocephalus have a pair of large grooved venom fangs, which are followed by two or three small maxillary teeth. The mandibular teeth are longest anteriorly. The head is distinct from the neck. The eye is rather small, with a round pupil. There is no loreal scale. The dorsal scales are smooth, without apical pits, and are arranged in 21 rows at midbody. The subcaudals are entire (undivided).

== Species ==
The genus Hoplocephalus contains the following species which are recognized as being valid.

- Hoplocephalus bitorquatus (Jan, 1859) – pale-headed snake
- Hoplocephalus bungaroides (Schlegel, 1837) – broad-headed snake
- Hoplocephalus stephensii Krefft, 1869 – Stephens's banded snake

Nota bene: A binomial authority in parentheses indicates that the species was originally described in a genus other than Hoplocephalus.
