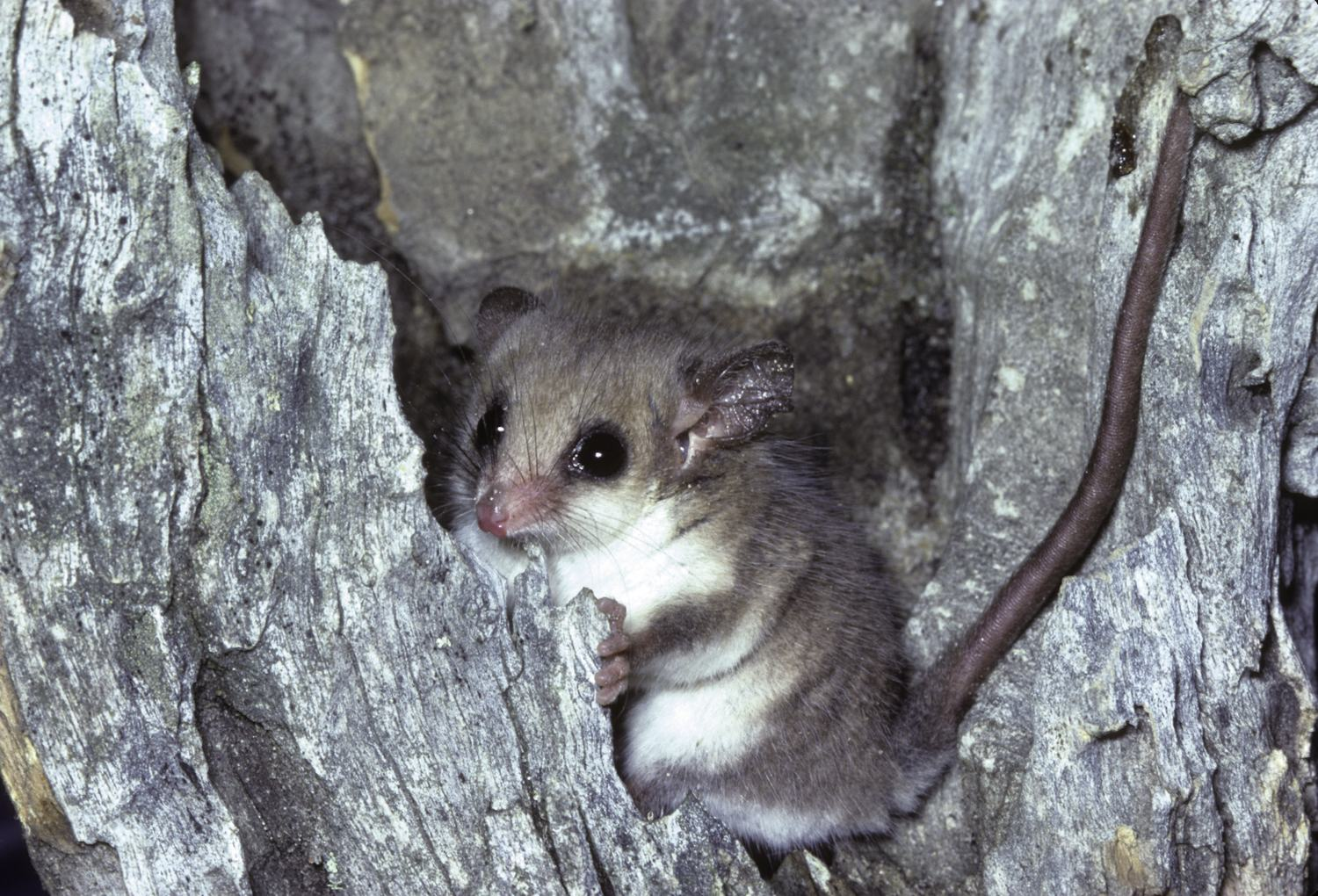
- Western pygmy possum

Conservation status
- Least Concern (IUCN 3.1)

Scientific classification
- Kingdom: Animalia
- Phylum: Chordata
- Class: Mammalia
- Infraclass: Marsupialia
- Order: Diprotodontia
- Family: Burramyidae
- Genus: Cercartetus
- Species: C. concinnus

Binomial name
- Cercartetus concinnus (Gould, 1845)
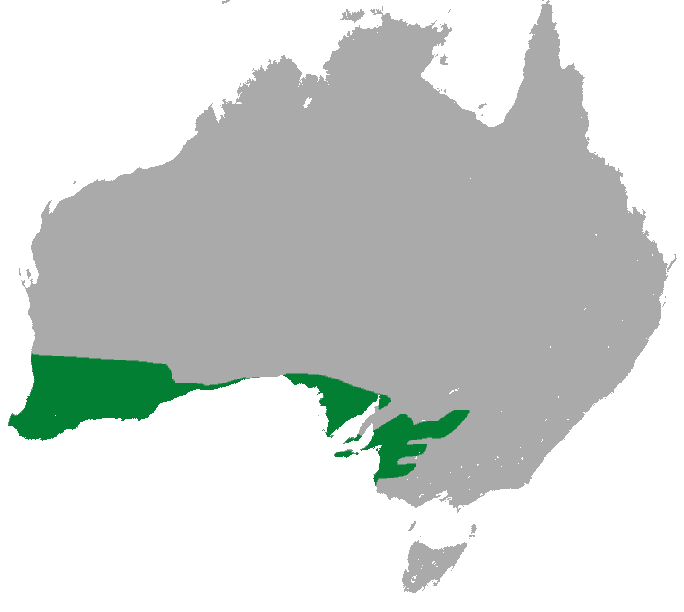
- Western pygmy possum range

= Western pygmy possum =

Western pygmy possum Temporal range: Late Pleistocene – Recent

Species of marsupial

The western pygmy possum (Cercartetus concinnus), also known as the southwestern pygmy possum or the mundarda, is a small nocturnal marsupial found in Australia. It is observed to be both arboreal and terrestrial, foraging on the ground or in trees and shrubs in search of different flowering plants, and predominantly feeding on the pollen and nectar of plants native to its habitat, such as Eucalyptus and Melaleuca. Its nightly movements are typically short, averaging around 50 m (160 ft), but individuals are capable of traveling much greater distances in search of food. Genetic studies indicate its closest relative is likely the eastern pygmy possum, from which its ancestors diverged around eight million years ago.

== Taxonomy ==
John Gould provided the first formal description of Cercartetus concinnus, which was presented to the Zoological Society of London and published in 1845. He initially placed the species in the genus Dromicia, noting its similarity to a previously described species found in Tasmania.

In the same year, G.R. Waterhouse independently described the animal as Phalangista (Dromicia) neillii, a name that is now considered a synonym of Cercartetus concinnus.

== Morphology and phylogeny ==
The molecular divergence of the Diprotodontia order indicates an early to mid-Eocene origin.

C. concinnus is thought to have diverged from its sister species, C. nanus, in the late Miocene period.

== Description ==
The western pygmy possum is unusual within Cercartetus, as, unlike its grey relatives, the fur over most of its body is a bright cinnamon colour. Like other members of the genus, it lacks a patagium, the gliding membrane present in some other possum species. It has pure white underparts, further distinguishing it from its relatives, and has a thin ring of dark brown fur in front of the eyes. The species has long, rounded flesh-coloured ears and large protruding black eyes. The muzzle is only sparsely covered in hair, exposing pink skin on the bare areas. The species has long whiskers. The prehensile tail is long and only lightly furred, with fine scales visible beneath the sparse hair, and is not enlarged at the base. The hind feet have opposable first digits, while all four feet have expanded apical pads at the tips of the toes possessing eccrine sweat glands.

Although small compared with most other possums, the western pygmy possum is one of the larger pygmy possums. Adults range from 7–10 cm (2.8–3.9 in) in head-body length, with a tail measuring 7–9 cm (2.8–3.5 in). Adult body mass ranges from 8 to 18 g (0.28 to 0.63 oz). The female has a well-developed forward-opening pouch, containing six teats. At up to 12 mm (0.47 in) in length, the tongue is unusually large relative to the size of the animal.

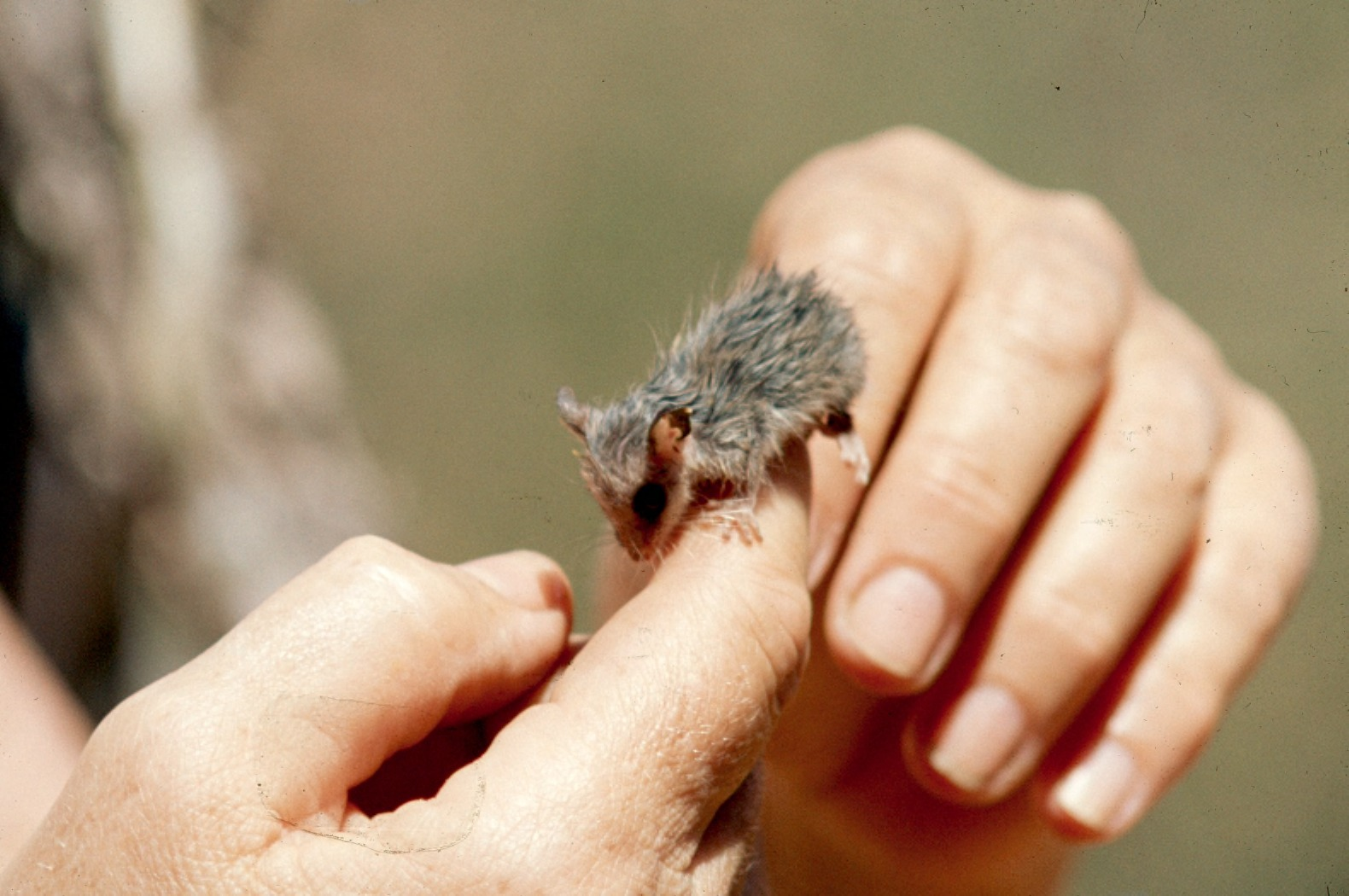
Western pygmy possum walking on person's hand

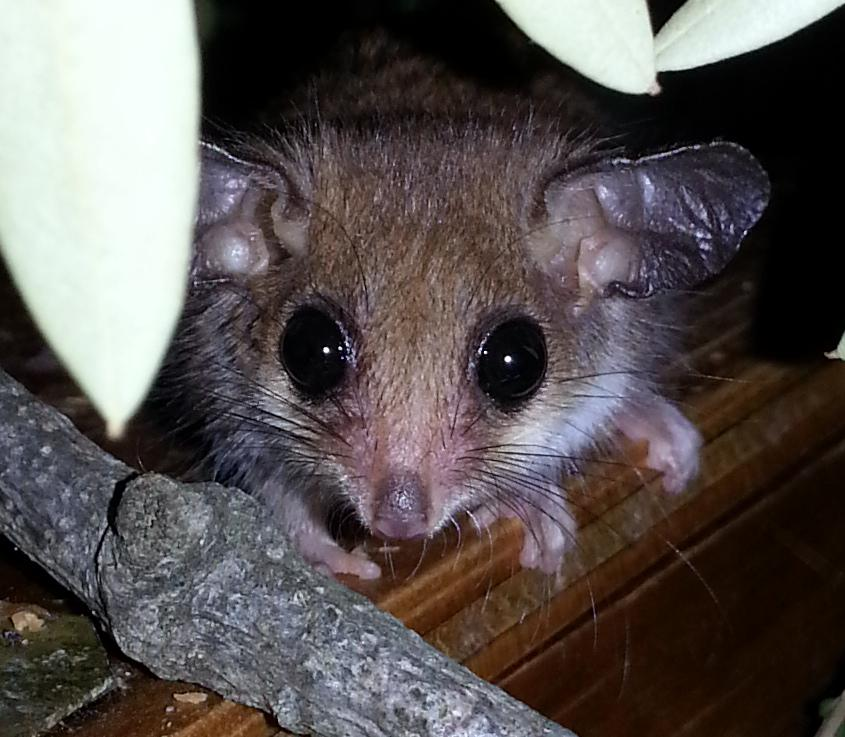
Captive Western pygmy possum at Cleland Wildlife Park, South Australia

== Distribution and habitat ==
This possum is vulnerable due to habitat loss and lack of food. The distribution range includes Southwest Australia, on the south coast and the wheatbelt, and areas of South Australia, Kangaroo Island, and into Victoria, as far south as Edenhope. It is also found in far southwestern New South Wales, where it is listed as endangered. It inhabits semi-arid woodland, shrubland, and heath, dominated by plants such as Callistemon (bottlebrushes), melaleuca, banksia, and grevillea. Distribution has been observed to coincide with patterns of rainfall that persist throughout the year that correspond with shifting abundances of food sources, given that primary productivity in its native habitat is attributed to high rainfall. Additionally, there has been some observed correspondence with presence and increasing tree canopy height, likely attributed to its foraging habits Although there had been previously thought to be two subspecies, separated in distribution by the Nullarbor Plain, genetic studies have not revealed any significant difference between the eastern and western populations. Furthermore, fossils have been found from the Nullarbor Plain region, although the species is no longer native to the area.

== Behaviour and diet ==
The western pygmy possum is solitary and nocturnal. During the day, it shelters in tree hollows or other natural crevices, birds' nests, or dense vegetation. At night, it travels in search of food or mates, typically moving around 50 m (160 ft) each day, although individuals may migrate to different areas over the course of a year depending on the availability of plant resources. Movements of between 1,000 and 4,000 m (3,300 and 13,100 ft) or more within a single night have also been recorded, possibly reflecting the patchy distribution of food resources within its habitat at different times of the year. The species spends most of its time in the trees, using their grasping paws and prehensile tails to grip onto branches, gather nest materials, and open flowers to access nectar. It has also been described as producing a rapid chattering call. Further, studies show that the species display a behavioral preference for shallow burrows covered by organic matter, including shrubs, and observed to switch nesting areas at frequent rates, as a behavioral tactic to avoid predators and seek out areas of higher food abundance. Other predator-avoiding behaviors include anachoresis, increased vigilance, flight, and withdrawal by retreating into their mother's pouch.

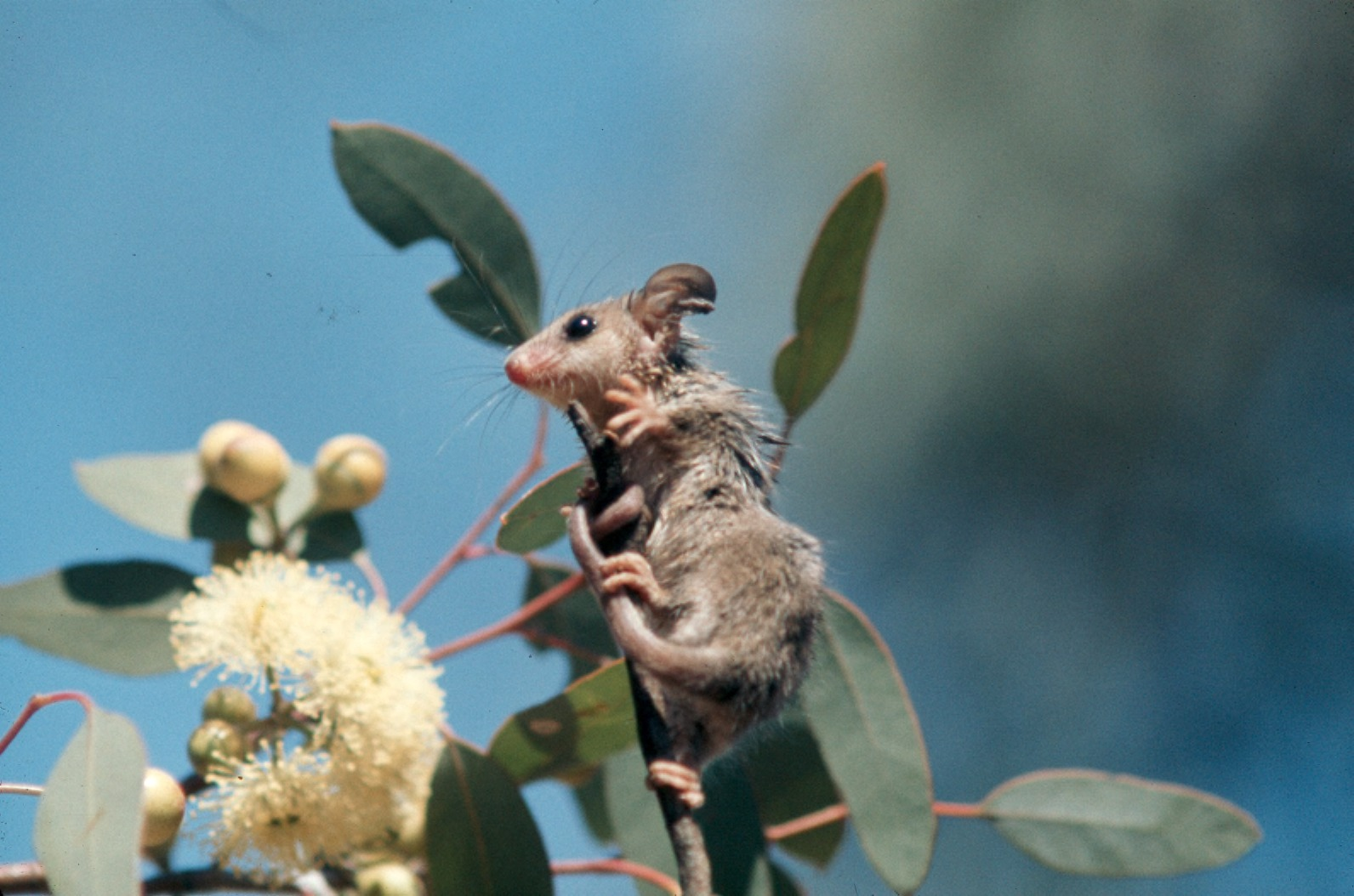
A Western pygmy possum in a flowering Eucalyptus tree, using its prehensile tail wrapped around a branch to stabilize itself

The western pygmy possum feeds primarily on nectar and pollen, especially from plants such as Melaleuca and Eucalyptus, and may play a role in the pollination. Eucalyptus rugosa was observed to be the most preferred food source. During periods when flowering plants are scarce, it has been observed to feed more frequently on sap and lerp, which may become the predominant food source, particularly in winter. The diet is also supplemented with insects. The species may show preferential diet choice based on sugar composition, favoring hexose sugars in Eucalyptus species over sucrose in other food sources as a result of their shorter gut that doesn't allow for effective processing.

C. concinnus species demonstrate long-distance travel to reach food sources when their abundance decreases, indicative of a vast habitat range.

== Torpor ==
The western pygmy possum is capable of entering torpor during cold or unfavourable conditions, allowing it to conserve energy and food reserves. Torpor occurs throughout the year but is typically longer and deeper in winter relative to the summer due to lower ambient temperatures. Seasonal differences in torpor patterns may also be influenced by photoperiod, with individuals adjusting entry and emergence in relation to sunrise and sunset, although further study is required. During bouts of torpor, which may last for up to seven days at a time, body temperature falls to within 1 °C (1.8 °F) of ambient temperature of 12 °C (54 °F), and oxygen consumption to just 1% of normal levels. Individuals typically rest on their fronts with their ears folded over their eyes and the tails coiled beneath the bodies. Compared with mammals of similar size, the species is able to arouse from torpor relatively quickly. Short bouts of torpor (less than 24 hours) usually begin before sunrise, while longer bouts (longer than 24 hours) are typically entered shortly after sunset, with the longest recorded torpor bout being 11 days.

== Adaptations ==
The western pygmy possum possesses adaptations that optimize its energy output and storage during torpor and hibernation to extend the frequency at which they a partake in these activities. Among Burramyids, Carcartetus species have adapted the ability to store fat at the proximal end of their tails, along with the general fattening of their body.

C. conicinnus has been reported to possess a relatively large brain-to-body size ratio compared to many other small marsupials. This characteristic has been associated with an increased cognitive capacity; including enhanced spatial awareness, and exploratory behavior. Such traits may facilitate complex habitat use, particularly in navigating fragmented vegetation and locating dispersed food sources.

As an adaptation towards obtaining nectar and pollen, its main food course, the western pygmy possum has a 10–12 mm (0.39–0.47 in) long, extensible tongue with dense number of papillae.

== Reproduction ==
Western pygmy possums can breed throughout the year, although reproduction occurs most frequently in spring, corresponding with increasing primary productivity in its native environment that allows for rapid population growth. Females give birth to litters of four to six young. The mother may carry more than six embryos at a time in the uterus, but because she only possesses six teats, and marsupial young remain attached to an individual teat during early development, six is the maximum number that can be reared. The mother may give birth as little as two days after weaning a previous litter, with the teats dramatically changing in size to accommodate the smaller young and the mammary glands reverting to production of colostrum. This is often attributed to the ability of delayed implantation, believed to be the reason why they can produce another litter even without male presence. Notably, the western pygmy possum does not go through diapause, which is attributed to the ever-growing blastocysts whose growth either slows or speeds up depending on lactation and suckling; never stopping completely. Anatomically, females possess 2 ovaries, 2 uteri, 2 lateral vaginas, and a urogenital urinary canal shared with the digestive tract, and males have a bifid penis and a non-pendulous, internal scrotum. Genetically, they possess YY/XX sex determination and 14 chromosomes.

The young remain blind when they leave the pouch at around 25 days of age. They initially stay within the nest and are fully weaned at approximately 50 days. Females reach sexual maturity at 12–5 months old.

== Conservation ==
The species is currently classified as Least Concern by the IUCN. However, several Australian states (New South Wales and South Australia) and individual parks and conservation regions have nationally listed it as Vulnerable, Endangered or Critically Endangered due to the pressure from vegetation clearing, the reduction of food sources (overgrazing of livestock), fire regimes, and introduced predators such as the red fox and feral cats.

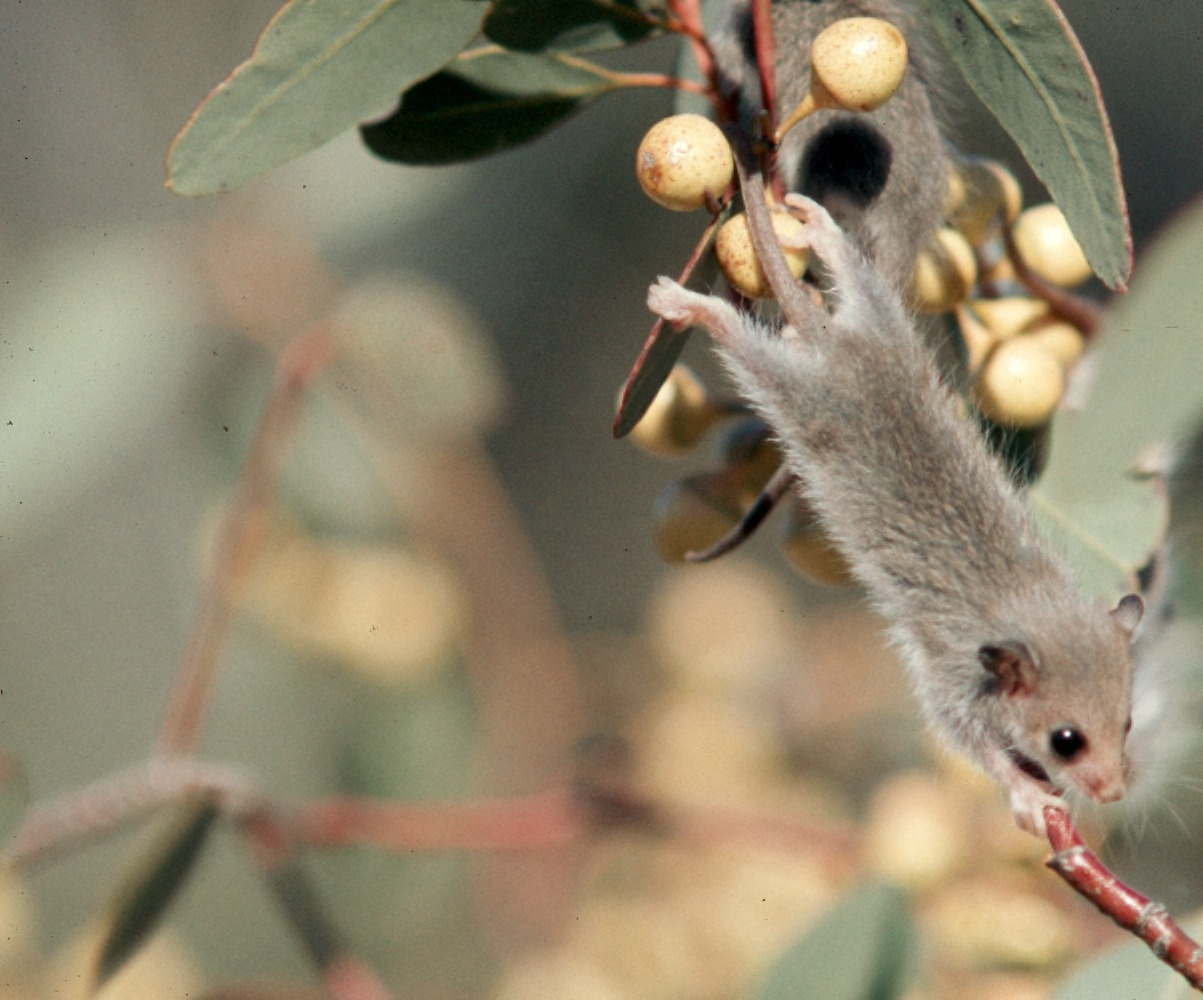
A Western pygmy possum climbing between branches on a Eucalyptus sp. tree

Western pygmy possums are highly dependent on mature vegetation containing tree hollows for shelter and nesting, making the removal of older trees through land clearing detrimental to local populations. Overgrazing by livestock and feral herbivores may reduce the abundance of flowering plants, potentially limiting nectar and pollen resources that form a key component of the species' diet. The species is also affected by habitat degradation associated with agriculture, forestry, and urban development, as well as predation by introduced species. Fire regimes may further impact populations by altering the availability of preferred food plants.

Protection of grass trees (genus Xanthorrhoea), which serve as one of the species' main and most important nesting sites, has been suggested as an indirect conservation measure for the species.

== Threats ==
Western pygmy possums are susceptible to parasites such as fleas and mites.

Native predators include quolls, snakes, and owls, although in modern times, the animal also falls prey to introduced carnivores such as red foxes and domestic cats. They are also susceptible to parasites like fleas and mites.

In laboratory and research settings aimed at gathering information about these species, researchers most often use pitfall traps to widely capture the possums. This method only renders effective in the summertime as winter months coincide with torpor.
