= Thomas Stephens (educationist) =

Australian educationist (1830–1913)

Thomas Stephens,, FGS, (4 October 1830 – 25 November 1913) was an Australian educationist.

Stephens was second son of the Rev. William Stephens, B.A., vicar of Levens, Westmoreland, England. The family came originally from the South of England, but a branch of it was settled for many years in County Cavan, Ireland, where they held considerable landed property. Mr. Stephens' grandfather was vicar of Castletown, Delvin, co. Westmeath. His father migrated to England, after being ordained, and remained, until his death in 1864, in charge of the Westmoreland parish.

Thomas Stephens was born at Levens, Westmorland in 1830, received his education at Marlborough College, proceeding thence to Oxford in 1850. Here he entered first at The Queen's College, Oxford, where his elder brother, Professor William Stephens, of the University of Sydney, was afterwards Fellow and Tutor; but subsequently obtained a scholarship at Magdalen Hall, now Hertford College. In 1854, he took his B.A. degree, and ten years later received that of M.A. In 1855 Stephens emigrated to Victoria (Australia), intending to follow pastoral pursuits, but was attracted to Tasmania in the following year, and in 1857 accepted the appointment of Inspector of Schools under the Northern Board of Education. On the amalgamation of the Northern and Southern Boards in 1863 he was appointed Inspector of Schools for the Colony, a title subsequently altered to Chief Inspector of Schools. While occupying this position, Stephens had a large and important share in the organisation of the system of primary education, and was the first to introduce a standard of instruction for the schools, and a scheme of classification for teachers.

On the passing of the Education Act in 1885, which placed the Department under the direct control of a Minister of the Crown, the offices of Chief Inspector and Secretary were amalgamated, and Stephens was appointed permanent head, with the title of Director of Education. In the years 1861–62, he was an active member of the Northern Board of Works, under whose direction the principal lines of road through the then little known North-Eastern and North-Western districts were planned and commenced. Stephens was the author of a number of papers, chiefly on geological subjects, contributed to the Proceedings of the Royal Society of Tasmania, of which Society he was one of the Vice-Presidents. He was a Fellow of the Geological Society of London, and a member of the Council of the University of Tasmania. Stephens died in Hobart, Tasmania, Australia on 25 November 1913.
