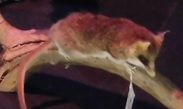

Conservation status
- Least Concern (IUCN 3.1)

Scientific classification
- Kingdom: Animalia
- Phylum: Chordata
- Class: Mammalia
- Infraclass: Marsupialia
- Order: Diprotodontia
- Family: Burramyidae
- Genus: Cercartetus
- Species: C. caudatus

Binomial name
- Cercartetus caudatus (A. Milne-Edwards, 1877)
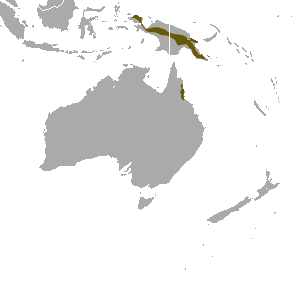
- Long-tailed pygmy possum range

= Long-tailed pygmy possum =

Species of marsupial

The long-tailed pygmy possum (Cercartetus caudatus) is a diprotodont marsupial found in the rainforests of northern Australia and New Guinea. Living at altitudes of above 1,500 m (4,900 ft), it eats insects and nectar, and may eat pollen in place of insects in the wild.

It is known as sumsum in the Kalam language of Papua New Guinea.

== Description ==
The long-tailed pygmy possum has large eyes, mouse/rodent-like ears, a pouch that opens anteriorly, and a tail that is about one and a half times as long as the body, giving the possum its name.

== Behaviour ==
Not much is known of this possum's behaviour, but what is known is that this species is both nocturnal and arboreal. In cold weather, it becomes torpid and looks and feels dead, but wakes at night. Not much is known on the origin of this torpor.

== Life cycle ==
This species breeds twice a year. Females have one to four young born around January and February and sometimes a second litter from late August to early September. The young leave the nest when they are 45 days old.

They only grow up to 10 cm (3.9 in).
