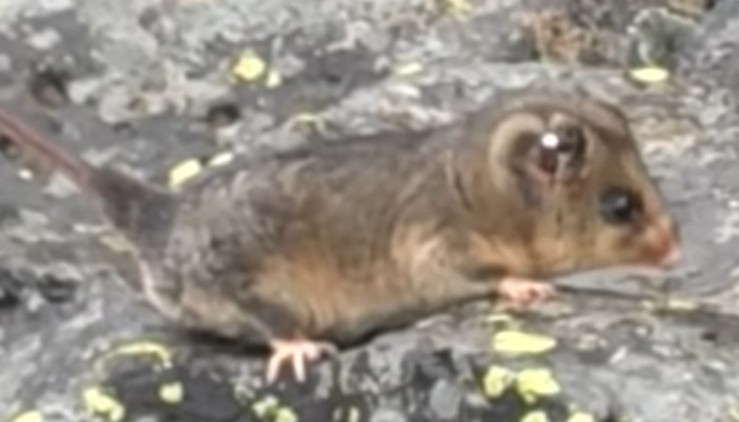
- Mountain pygmy possum (Burramys parvus)

Scientific classification
- Kingdom: Animalia
- Phylum: Chordata
- Class: Mammalia
- Infraclass: Marsupialia
- Order: Diprotodontia
- Family: Burramyidae
- Genus: Burramys; Broom, 1896

Type species
- Burramys parvus Broom, 1896

Species
- †B. wakefieldi; †B. tridactylus; †B. brutyi; B. parvus
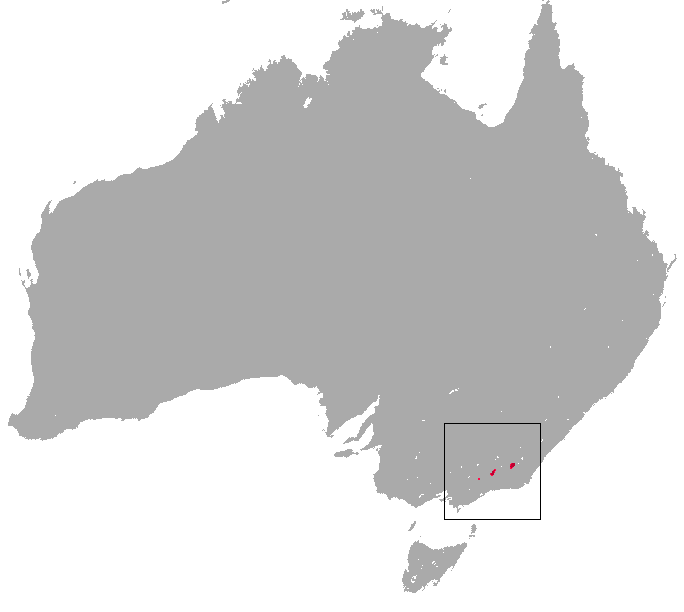
- Burramys distribution

= Burramys =

Burramys Temporal range: Pleistocene - Recent

Genus of marsupials

Burramys is a genus of the family Burramyidae, and is represented by one living and 3 extinct (fossil) species. It is one of two genera of pygmy possum, the other being Cercartetus.

== Taxonomy ==
- Genus Burramys
  - †Burramys wakefieldi
  - †Burramys triradiatus
  - †Burramys brutyi
  - Burramys parvus
