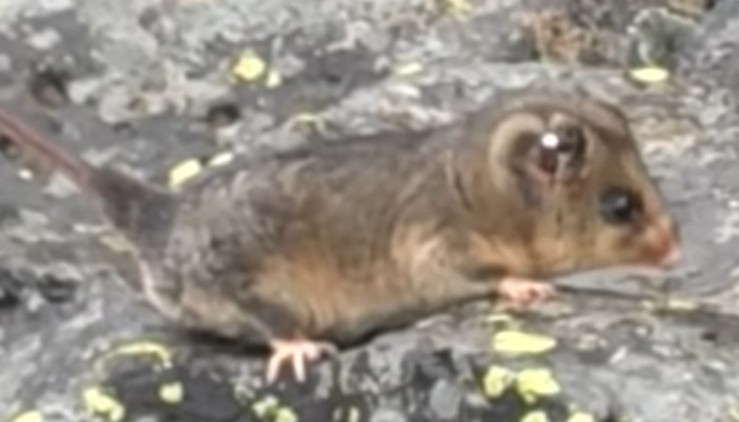

Conservation status
- Critically Endangered (IUCN 3.1)

Scientific classification
- Kingdom: Animalia
- Phylum: Chordata
- Class: Mammalia
- Infraclass: Marsupialia
- Order: Diprotodontia
- Family: Burramyidae
- Genus: Burramys
- Species: B. parvus

Binomial name
- Burramys parvus Broom, 1896
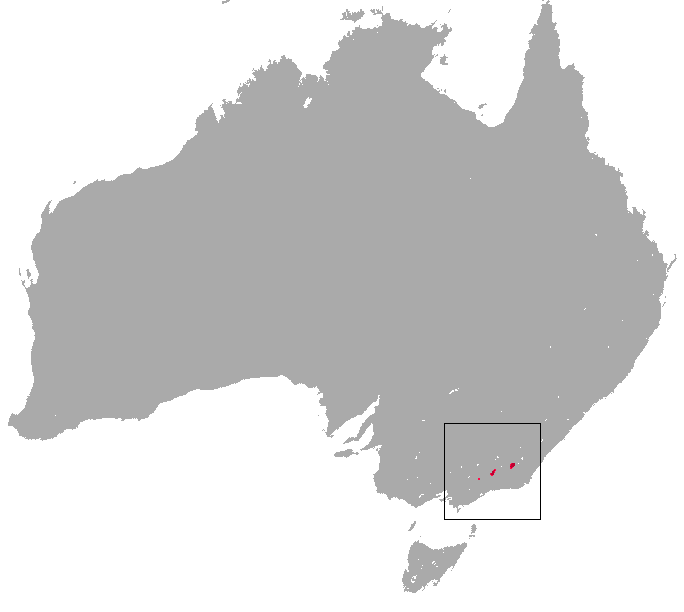
- Mountain pygmy possum range

= Mountain pygmy possum =

Mountain pygmy possum Temporal range: Pleistocene – Recent

Species of marsupial

The mountain pygmy possum (Burramys parvus), also simply known as the burramys, is a small, mouse-sized (weighs 45 grams (1.6 oz)) nocturnal marsupial of Australia found in dense alpine rock screes and boulder fields, mainly southern Victoria and around Mount Kosciuszko in Kosciuszko National Park in New South Wales at elevations from 1,300 to 2,230 metres (4,270 to 7,320 ft). At almost 14 cm (5.5 in), its prehensile tail is longer than its 11 cm (4.3 in) combined head and body length. Its diet consists of insects (such as the bogong moth), fleshy fruits, nuts, nectar and seeds. Its body is covered in a thick coat of fine grey fur except for its stomach, which is cream coloured; its tail is hairless. On the underside of the female's body is a pouch containing four teats. This possum is the only extant species in the genus Burramys. It is also the only Australian mammal restricted to alpine habitat.

== Discovery ==
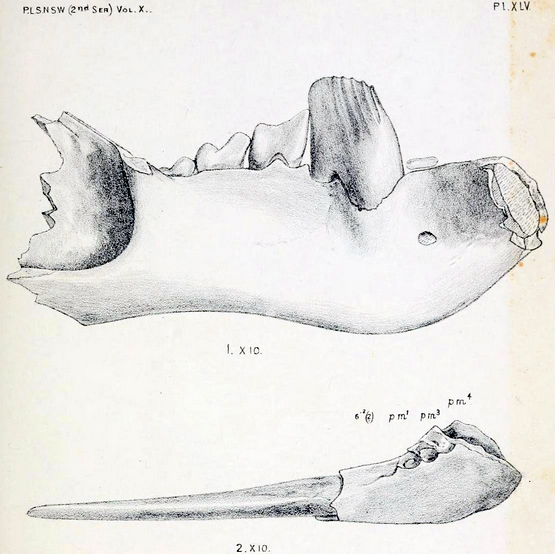
Plate from the 1896 description

The mountain pygmy possum was first discovered in the fossil record in 1895 when a portion of the jaw and skull bones were found in the Wombeyan Caves in central New South Wales. At the time, the species was believed to be extinct. It was not until 1966 that a living individual was found at a ski resort at Mount Hotham in Victoria. Since that time, the mountain pygmy possum has been located in three isolated, genetically distinct populations in the alpine regions of southern Australia.

== Description ==
The mountain pygmy possum is a small rodent-like marsupial. The mountain pygmy possum has an average weight of approximately 45 g (1.6 oz) and an average head and body length of 110 mm (4.3 in). The species is sexually dimorphic, with males being slightly larger than females. They have large, forward pointing eyes and short pointed snouts. Mountain pygmy possums exhibit diprotodont dentition, with three upper incisors and two upper premolars. On the syndactylous hind feet, they possess an opposable hallux. In addition, the mountain pygmy possum has a pouch which opens anteriorly and contains four teats. Pygmy possums are covered in a layer of fine, dense fur. Their pelage is greyish-brown on the dorsal side, with a darker stripe along the midline of the back, and a pale cream colour on the ventral side. They typically have a darker grey ring surrounding the eyes. During breeding season, males become more tawny-orange on the abdomen and flanks. The mountain pygmy possum has a long prehensile tail, averaging about 140 mm (5.5 in) in length, which is sparsely haired.

== Habitat and geographic range ==
The mountain pygmy possum is endemic to the alpine regions of southern Australia. The species is currently restricted to three isolated mountain regions: (1) Mount Blue Cow in Kosciuszko National Park in New South Wales, (2) Mount Bogong and Mount Higginbotham/Loch in the Bogong High Plains in Victoria, and (3) Mount Buller in Victoria. The typical home ranges within these mountain ranges differ for males and females. Females tend to reside at higher elevations of approximately 1,400–2,228 m (4,593–7,310 ft) near patches of block streams and other deep boulder formations. The home range of a female mountain pygmy possum is correlated with the density of bogong moths, the pygmy possum's preferred food source, which varies at different elevations. Females at higher elevations have smaller home ranges due to a relatively greater abundance of bogong moths, whereas females residing at lower elevations typically have much larger home ranges as the quantity of moths declines. Male mountain pygmy possums reside at low elevations, generally between 1,200–1,300 m (3,900–4,300 ft), of these mountain ranges. Male home ranges are largest during the breeding season, between November and December, when they migrate to female nesting sites, and decline thereafter.

== Foraging habits and behaviour ==
Mountain pygmy possums prefer to feed on bogong moths which make up about a third of their diet. This moth species (Agrotis infusa) migrates to the high alpine mountainous regions during the spring and summer months. During these months, mountain pygmy possums utilise bogong moths as their principal food source. In the autumn months, bogong moths depart from the mountain ranges and mountain pygmy possums must supplement their diets with fruits and seeds. Burramys parvis species will supplement their diet with the mountain plum pine from the fruit-bearing conifer Podocarpus lawrencei as well as seeds from the snow beard-heaths Leucopogon spp. and blackberry Rubus spp. Upon finding food, the mountain pygmy possum will first smell the food source before picking it up with its incisors. It will then transfer the item to its forelimbs so that it may manipulate the food and tear off pieces of flesh.

== Reproduction ==
Mountain pygmy possums have an annual reproductive cycle. Although females are polyestrous, the need for sufficient fat reserves during hibernation limits females to one litter per year. In order to ensure adequate fat reserves, female mountain pygmy possums will synchronise reproduction for the spring months, when bogong moths are abundant. The breeding season typically occurs during the Austral spring months of October and November. During this time, males migrate to the higher elevation nesting sites of females to mate. Mountain pygmy possums then have an internal gestation period of 14–16 days after which the altricial young will enter the forward-facing pouch of the female. A female mountain pygmy possum has four teats, and a litter is usually three to four offspring. The young remain in the pouch for approximately 3 weeks, after which they remain at the nest for another 3–4 weeks. The offspring are then weaned at around 9–10 weeks. The mating system that occurs in Burramys parvus is resource defence polygyny. A philopatric group of females typically share a nest space within deep boulder crevices. The nest sites are generally areas of high densities of migrating bogong moths. Shortly after mating season, females will drive the male pygmy possums from the nest. The male mountain pygmy possums do not participate in parental care. Additionally, juvenile males are driven from the nest shortly after weaning. As noted in all species of Burramyids, mountain pygmy possums become sexually mature by one year of age.

== Behaviour ==
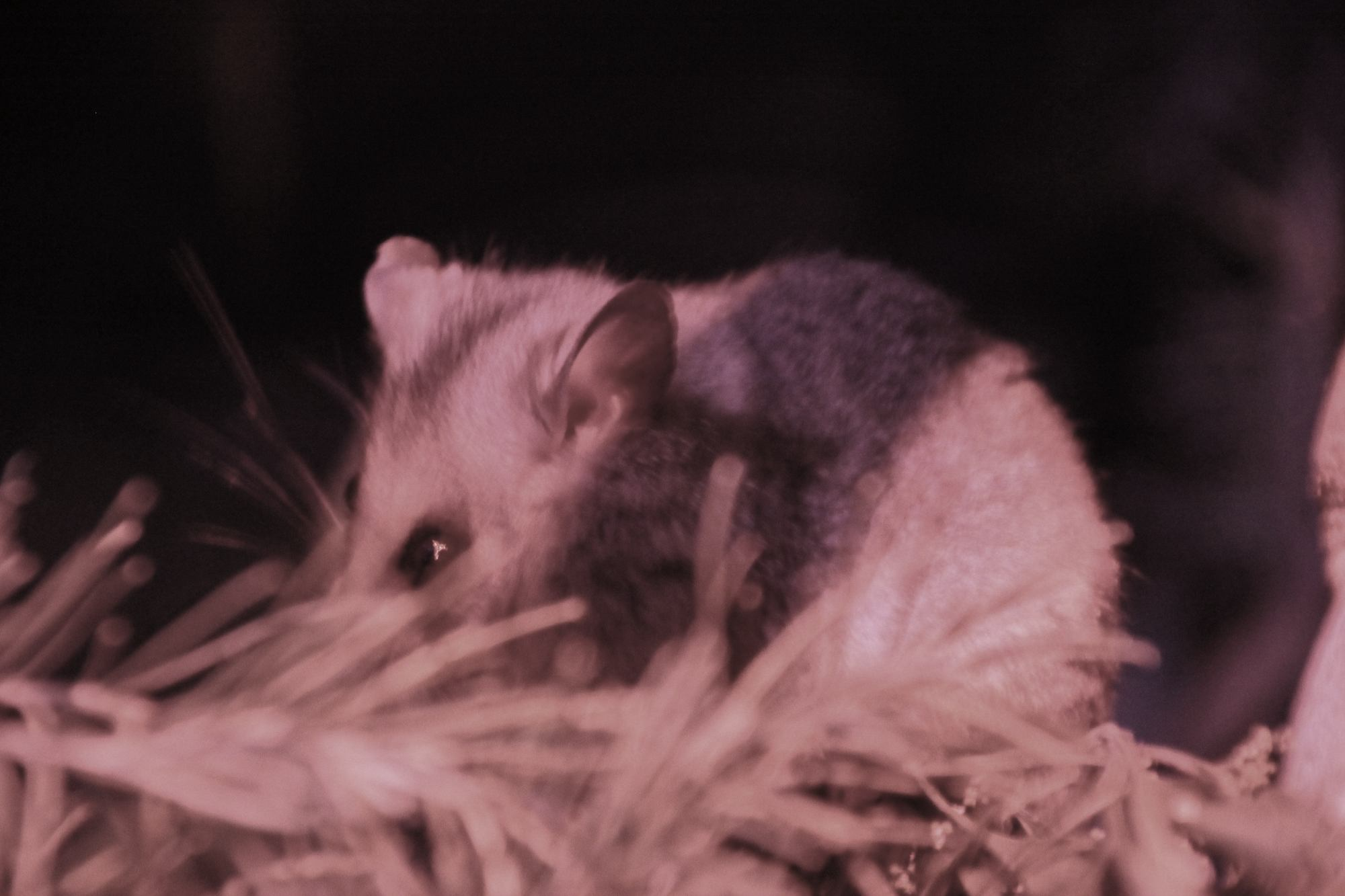
Mountain pygmy possum at Reptile Park, Gosford

Mountain pygmy possums are nocturnal creatures, preferring to sleep during the day and forage at night. While all other members of the family Burramyidae are arboreal, the mountain pygmy possum is a terrestrial species. The preferred habitat of these pygmy possums is within deep boulderfields in alpine regions of Southern Australia. The females tend to stay in familial groups of up to 10 related individuals. Females also tend to be relatively sedentary and exhibit high nest site fidelity.

Male mountain pygmy possums, on the other hand, tend to be solitary, leaving nesting sites as juveniles to take residence in lower elevations of the mountain ranges. For this reason, male mountain pygmy possums generally suffer higher mortality than females as the boulder fields appear to offer some protection from predation. Burramys parvus is noted to be the only small mammal in Australia that hibernates seasonally for long periods of time. All other members of Burramyidae are capable of opportunistic hibernation.

Adult mountain pygmy possums enter hibernation for a period of up to seven months, whereas juveniles generally hibernate for about five months. Both males and females rely heavily on bogong moths as an energy-rich food and for the fattening period which occurs prior to hibernation. Mountain pygmy possums are also noted to cache seeds and berries which they will feed on during periods when they awaken from torpor. During the months of hibernation, Burramys parvus is noted to awaken from torpor for periods of two to three days at a time during which the animal will feed on cached food resources. These periods of arousal typically occur when the ambient temperature is 4–7 °C (39–45 °F). During the hibernating period, the mountain pygmy possum is capable of reducing its temperature to 2 °C (36 °F). Individuals in torpid periods will curl their bodies up, tucking their heads into their chest or abdomen in order to retain body heat. In addition, females have been observed sharing nests constructed from moss and snow grass. Both males and females are noted to hibernate under an insulating layer of snow.

During the breeding season in the spring and summer months, older, heavier mountain pygmy possums typically occupy the highest quality habitats. While males are generally tolerant of one another during most of the year, they can act aggressively toward each other during the breeding season. Aggression is noted in both males and females in the form of tail biting. Females are observed to act very aggressively towards both males and females when defending nesting sites, especially when offspring are present. Additionally, females are aggressive to adult males following the breeding season as well as to juvenile males post-weaning.

== Conservation status ==
Since 2008, the mountain pygmy possum has been declared by the IUCN Red List as critically endangered. Population estimates totalled fewer than 2000 individuals from the three combined isolated populations in 2000. Current population estimates indicate that these numbers have severely declined in the last decade. The most recent study conducted in 2006 at Mount Buller tallied only 30 adults. As of 2007, the number of females recorded at Mount Blue Cow had Kosciuszko National Park with a total of 60 individuals. In 2021, scientists estimated that there were still fewer than 2000 individuals.

=== Threats to survival ===
The biggest threats to the mountain pygmy possum populations include habitat destruction and fragmentation, climate change, predation by feral cats and red foxes, and threats to their prime food source, the bogong moth.

The construction of ski resorts in the alpine regions in which the mountain pygmy possums inhabit has been one of the greatest factors attributed to population decline. At Mount Higginbotham, a major road constructed to the Mount Hotham ski resort prevented male mountain pygmy possums from migrating to the female nesting sites during the breeding season. This physical barrier was noted to markedly increase winter mortality in the Mount Higginbotham population. In response to this, a tunnel was constructed which provided male pygmy possums with an alternative migratory route.

Climate change is another serious threat to the mountain pygmy possum. Burramys parvus is the only Australian mammal which is completely restricted to the alpine regions. The species is well adapted to the seasonal availability of bogong moths and other food resources. Although data from New South Wales and Victoria are still pending, preliminary models suggest that reduced survival of mountain pygmy possums can be related to declining snow cover and shorter winters. Studies conducted at Kosciuszko National Park revealed that the period of snow cover was diminished by an average of 10 days and snow melt occurred approximately 15 days earlier. Linda Broome and her group of researchers determined that, while hibernation sites appeared well insulated despite lack of snow, snow cover provides additional protection to the mountain pygmy possums during the coldest months. This added layer of insulation is believed to promote prolonged torpor and decrease waking intervals which can deplete energy stores and decrease possum survival. As a suggested solution to this environmental disturbance, Broome and her colleagues proposed moving the remaining populations of mountain pygmy possums from their alpine habitats to lower elevation temperate rainforests. This solution is based on previous husbandry efforts, which showed that mountain pygmy possums did not require a period of hibernation at environmental temperatures above 12 °C (54 °F).

A third negative impact on the mountain pygmy possum population is high levels of predation by red foxes (Vulpes vulpes) and feral cats. In order to control the level of predation, threat abatement plans are in place. These threat abatement plans identify the necessary actions required to protect all species affected by predation of red foxes and feral cats.

Research has also extended to identify the threats impacting the survival of the bogong moth. This moth species is the preferred food source of mountain pygmy possums. Their arrival during the spring months acts as a seasonal indicator signalling the end of hibernation for the possums. In addition, bogong moths are rich in protein and fat and they provide mountain pygmy possums with the necessary energy reserves to sustain the seven-month hibernation period.

=== Captive breeding programmes ===
The Foundation for National Parks & Wildlife has implemented captive breeding programmes under the support and guidance of Linda Broome and her colleagues. In addition, Zoos Victoria has also become involved in the effort to sustain the remaining populations of mountain pygmy possums. Zoos Victoria started a captive breeding programme for B. parvus in 2007 in the Healesville Sanctuary. The programme as of December 2013 cared for a population of 45 mountain pygmy possums. Their overall goal is to down-list the mountain pygmy possum to a lower-threat category on the IUCN Redlist.

As of 2021 there is a new captive breeding project under way in Lithgow, New South Wales, called Secret Creek Sanctuary. The creation of the sanctuary has been aided by a donation of A$190,000 from Prague Zoo, which had set up a fund-raiser during the 2019–20 bushfires in Australia. The Australian Wildlife Society also contributed much-needed funds to help save this species from the risk of extinction. About 15 animals will be live-captured from Mt Kosciusko, acclimatised in special enclosures, and released then into the sanctuary.

=== 2016 National Recovery Plan ===
In 2016 the first national recovery plan (under the Commonwealth Environment Protection and Biodiversity Conservation Act 1999) for this species was prepared, to counter the threats caused by habitat loss and fragmentation, predators (cats and foxes) and climate change, in particular to the tiny Mt Buller population. The plan detailed its distribution, habitat, threats, recovery objectives and actions necessary to ensure its long-term survival.

=== 2018–19: decline in bogong moths ===
Scientists observed a catastrophic drop in bogong moth numbers in the summer of 2018–2019, due to climate-change-induced droughts in the moth's breeding areas. With the lack of moths as a food source during the breeding season in the spring of 2018, the possums lost litters owing to inadequate nourishment. As a similar situation occurred in the spring of 2017, adult possum numbers were predicted to decline as well.

In the spring and summer seasons of 2017–18 and 2018–19, dramatic drops in numbers of the moths in the Alpine caves were observed. Millions of the moths typically line the walls of these caves over summer, but in 2017–2018, some had none. Eric Warrant of Lund University attributed the falling numbers to winter drought in their breeding areas and climate change, the lack of rain producing insufficient vegetation to feed the caterpillars.

Other biologists and ecologists have pointed to the dramatic effect on the animals which feed on the moths, which are an important source of protein for wildlife, including the mountain pygmy possum as well as other insectivorous mammals and birds. "The vulnerability of the Australian Alps to climate change is the worst in the world because we've got these short little mountains so when it gets warmer, there is nowhere for these cold-adapted species to go", according to Deakin University wildlife ecologist Euan Ritchie.
