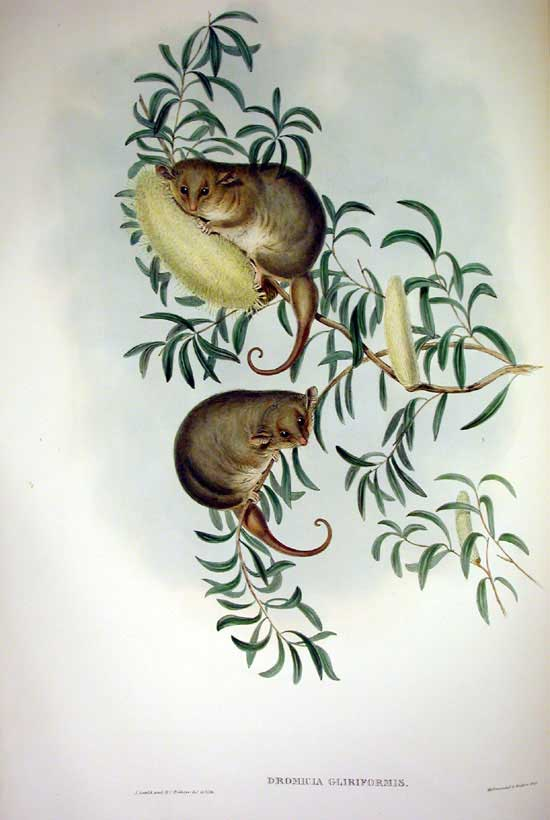
- Cercartetus nanus

Scientific classification
- Kingdom: Animalia
- Phylum: Chordata
- Class: Mammalia
- Infraclass: Marsupialia
- Order: Diprotodontia
- Family: Burramyidae
- Genus: Cercartetus; Gloger, 1841

Type species
- Phalangista nana Desmarest, 1818

Species
- C. caudatus; C. concinnus; C. lepidus; C. nanus; Foja pygmy possum Cercartetus sp.(undescribed)
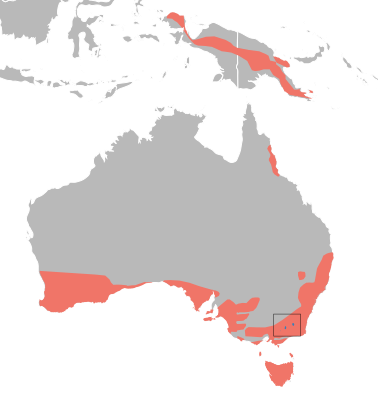
- Burramyidae distribution. Cercartetus in red.

= Cercartetus =

Cercartetus Temporal range: Late Pleistocene - Recent

Genus of marsupials

The genus Cercartetus is a group of very small possums known as pygmy possums. Four species comprise this genus, which together with the genus Burramys make up the marsupial family Burramyidae.

It has occasionally been presumed that Cercaërtus was a misspelling or synonym of Cercartetus. However, the name Cercaërtus is a junior synonym of Trichosurus and not of Cercartetus.

Conservation International (CI) and the Indonesia Institute of Science (LIPI) reported on the possible discovery of a new species of Cercartetus pygmy possum upon visit to the Foja Mountains in June 2007.

== Species ==
- Genus Cercartetus
  - Long-tailed pygmy possum, Cercartetus caudatus
  - Southwestern pygmy possum, Cercartetus concinnus
  - Tasmanian pygmy possum, Cercartetus lepidus
  - Eastern pygmy possum, Cercartetus nanus
