= William Stephens (academic) =

Educator and museum administrator (1829–1890)

William John Stephens FGS, (16 July 1829 – 22 November 1890) was headmaster at Sydney Grammar School, a professor at the University of Sydney and museum administrator.

Stephens was born in Levens, Westmorland, the son of the Rev. William Stephens, of Heversham, Westmorland, and his wife Alicia, née Daniell. William, junior, was an elder brother of Thomas Stephens. William was educated at Marlborough College, and at The Queen's College, Oxford, where he was scholar from 1848 to 1853; Fellow from 1853 to 1860; Lecturer in 1854; and Tutor from 1855 to 1856.

Professor Stephens, who graduated B.A. in 1852 and M.A. in 1855, accepted the post of headmaster of Sydney Grammar School, and held it for ten years, when he founded The New School (Eaglesfield from 1879), which he conducted with success for fifteen years. He was then appointed Professor of Geology and Palaeontology at the University of Sydney, a post which he retained until his death. During the interval which elapsed between the death of Dr. Charles Badham and the appointment of Professor Scott, Professor Stephens took charge of the higher classical work at the University. Among other offices held by him at the time of his death, which took place in Darlinghurst, Sydney on 22 November 1890, were those of Chairman of the Board of Trustees of the Free Public Library, Trustee of the Sydney Museum, President of the Linnean Society, President of the Royal Geographical Society, and President of the Zoological Society.

Stephens was survived by his wife Anna Louise, née Daniell (married 8 July 1859), a son and a daughter, the artist Ethel Stephens.

== Legacy ==
Stephens is commemorated in the scientific name of a species of Australian venomous snake, Hoplocephalus stephensii.
