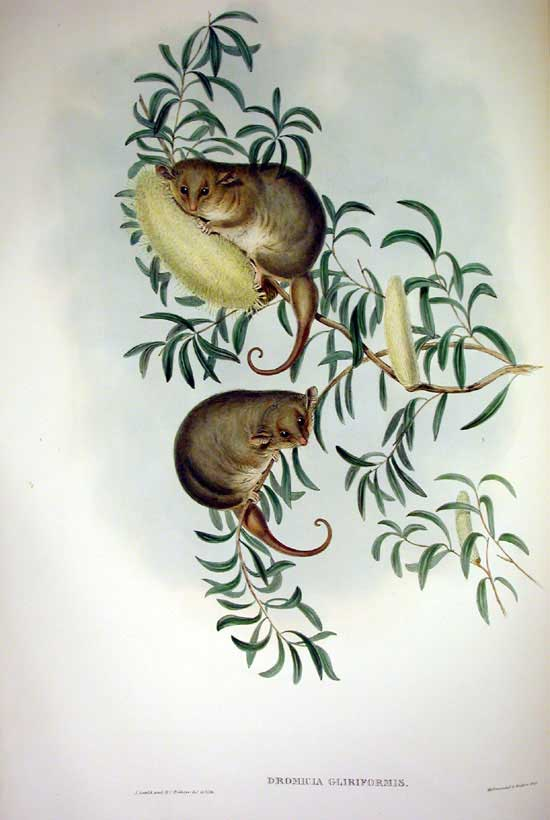
- Eastern pygmy possum (Cercartetus nanus)

Scientific classification
- Kingdom: Animalia
- Phylum: Chordata
- Class: Mammalia
- Infraclass: Marsupialia
- Order: Diprotodontia
- Suborder: Phalangeriformes
- Superfamily: Phalangeroidea
- Family: Burramyidae; Broom, 1898

Genera
- Burramys; Cercartetus
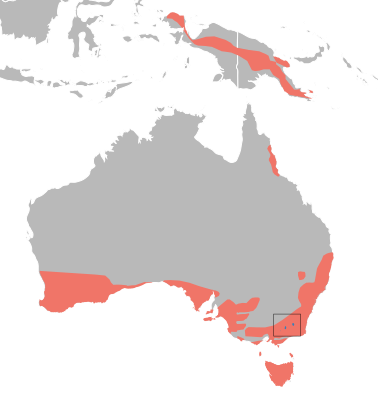
- Burramyidae distribution. Cercartetus in red; Burramys in blue in box.

= Pygmy possum =

Pygmy possums Temporal range: Pleistocene–Recent

Family of marsupials

The pygmy possums are a family of small possums that together form the marsupial family Burramyidae. The five extant species of pygmy possum are grouped into two genera. Four of the species are endemic to Australia, with one species also co-occurring in Papua New Guinea and Indonesia.

Pygmy possums range in length from about 5 to 12 cm (2.0 to 4.7 in), and usually weigh between 10 and 50 grams (0.35 and 1.76 oz). They are nocturnal and omnivorous, living on a diet of invertebrates, fruit, seed, nectar and pollen. They are excellent climbers, due in part to their prehensile tails. Although they cannot glide like some possums, some species can leap long distances. They have a prehensile tail for grabbing branches, but spend most of their time on the ground.

Conservation International (CI) and the Indonesian Institute of Sciences (LIPI) reported the possible discovery of a new species of Cercartetus pygmy possum upon visit to the Foja Mountains in June 2007.

The mountain pygmy possum is the only mammal restricted to the alpine and sub-alpine areas of mainland Australia. It was thought to be extinct until rediscovered in 1966 at Mt Higginbotham in Victoria. They are the only Australian marsupial that hibernates. Given the alpine climates in which they live they store energy in fat deposits before rolling into a ball and engaging in heterothermy during winter months.

== Classification ==
The two genera of pygmy possums are Burramys and Cercartetus. Burramys contains only one extant species, the mountain pygmy possum, B. parvus. As currently understood, Cercartetus consists of four extant species.

- Family Burramyidae: pygmy possums
  - Genus Burramys
    - Mountain pygmy possum, B. parvus
    - †Burramys wakefieldi
    - †Burramys triradiatus
    - †Burramys brutyi
  - Genus Cercartetus
    - Long-tailed pygmy possum, C. caudatus
    - Western pygmy possum, C. concinnus
    - Tasmanian pygmy possum, C. lepidus
    - Eastern pygmy possum, C. nanus

† = extinct species
