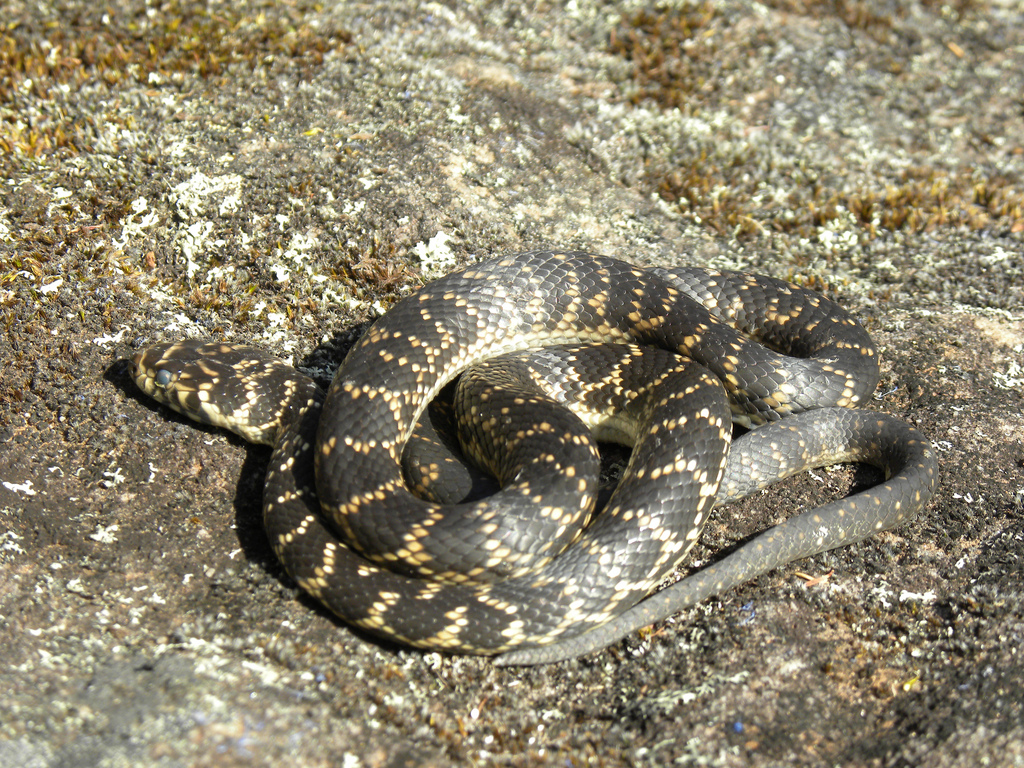

Conservation status
- Vulnerable (IUCN 3.1)
- CITES Appendix II

Scientific classification
- Kingdom: Animalia
- Phylum: Chordata
- Class: Reptilia
- Order: Squamata
- Suborder: Serpentes
- Family: Elapidae
- Genus: Hoplocephalus
- Species: H. bungaroides

Binomial name
- Hoplocephalus bungaroides (Schlegel, 1837)

Synonyms
- Naja bungaroides Schlegel, 1837; Elapocormus bungaroides — Fitzinger, 1843; Alecto variegata A.M.C. Duméril, Bibron & A.H.A. Duméril, 1854; Alecto bungaroides — A.M.C. Duméril, Bibron & A.H.A. Duméril, 1854; Hoplocephalus bungaroides — Cogger, 1983

= Broad-headed snake =

Species of snake

The broad-headed snake (Hoplocephalus bungaroides) is a species of venomous snake in the family Elapidae. The species is restricted to the Sydney Basin in New South Wales, Australia. It is one of three snakes in the genus Hoplocephalus, all restricted to eastern Australia. It is currently endangered in New South Wales and is listed as vulnerable under the Commonwealth Legislation.

== Taxonomy ==
The broad-headed snake has had a confused taxonomy. The species name Naja bungaroides, with an insufficient diagnosis, was originally coined in 1828 by Friedrich Boie for the king cobra. Johann Georg Wagler validated N. bungaroides in 1830 with a more accurate diagnosis and reclassified it into its own genus, Hoplocephalus. In 1837, German naturalist Hermann Schlegel officially described the broad-headed snake, but broke the principle of priority by using the name Naja bungaroides for it and moving the king cobra to Naja bungarus. The species name Hoplocephalus bungaroides became conflated with the broad-headed snake after this, despite technically being the oldest name for the king cobra. The discrepancy was finally discovered in 2024; due to the longstanding usage of the species name in the scientific literature, it was decided to maintain Hoplocephalus bungaroides as the scientific name for the broad-headed snake and designate a new type specimen for it.

== Description ==
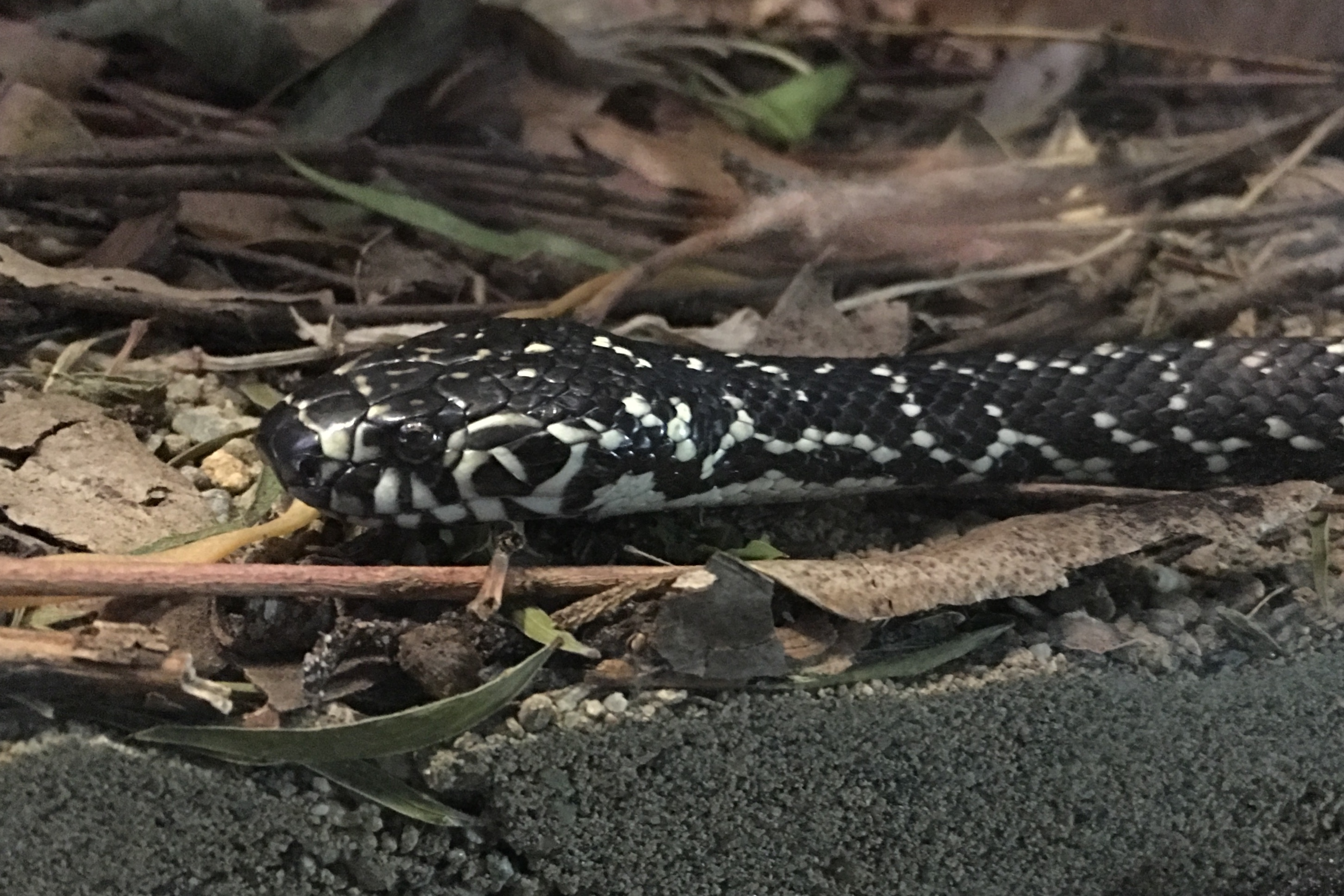
Head and neck of a broad-headed snake in captivity at Taronga Zoo Sydney.

The broad-headed snake is a small to medium-sized species of venomous snake, which attains an average total length (including tail) of 60 cm (24 in), although some records show that it can grow as long as 90 cm (35 in). It is black with numerous irregular yellow markings arranged in narrow cross-bands, which for inexperienced people can easily lead to confusion with a young diamond python, which is superficially very similar and found in the same habitat.In 2023 a man was bitten in the Southern Highlands of NSW after capturing a Broad-headed snake he believed to be a Diamond Python to show his children.

== Distribution and habitat ==
The broad-headed snake is found in the Sydney Basin in New South Wales, Australia. The snake's choice of habitat depends on temperature, age, sex, and breeding status. In the colder months, adult and juvenile snakes reside in the crevices of sandstone outcrops on exposed cliff edges to maximise warmth from the sun. When the temperature rises in spring, adult males and non-breeding females move to adjacent woodlands and forests, inhabiting hollow trees during the summer months. Juvenile snakes and gravid females remain in the rocks and move to cooler, shaded areas.

Their habitat has been degraded by urbanization, illegal rock removal, vandalisation and indiscriminate reptile collecting. The sandstone rocks that the snakes occupy are valued for landscaping purposes. Their removal has led to a loss of habitat for both the snakes and their prey.

== Behavior ==
=== Diet ===
The broad-headed snake feeds infrequently on small reptiles and mammals. Snakes in captivity are able to maintain or gain weight when fed one to two newborn rats per month. In one documented case, a snake survived a fast lasting twelve months.

Juveniles feed mostly on Lesueur's velvet gecko (Amalosia lesueurii) and occasionally on small skinks. Adults feed on Lesueur's velvet gecko, but also prey on other lizards, small snakes, and mice.

=== Breeding ===
Male broad-headed snakes reach maturity after five years whereas females require six. Mating occurs from autumn to spring, and mature females produce a litter every two years. Unlike most of its venomous counterparts, the broad-headed snake gives birth to live young. Birth occurs between January and April, with each litter resulting in 4–12 offspring born in mucous sacks. Unfertilized oocytes and stillborn offspring are common.

== Conservation status ==
The broad-headed snake was once commonly found in parts of Sydney including around Sydney Harbour; however, it is currently listed as an endangered species in New South Wales and vulnerable under the national Commonwealth Legislation. Its declining numbers are the result of a combination of factors including habitat loss through urbanisation, bush rock removal and irresponsible collecting.

== Sources ==
- Wildlife of Sydney Fact File
- DEH Species Profiles - ''Hoplocephalus bungaroides'' - Broad-headed Snake
- A snake bite victim's case of mistaken identity
