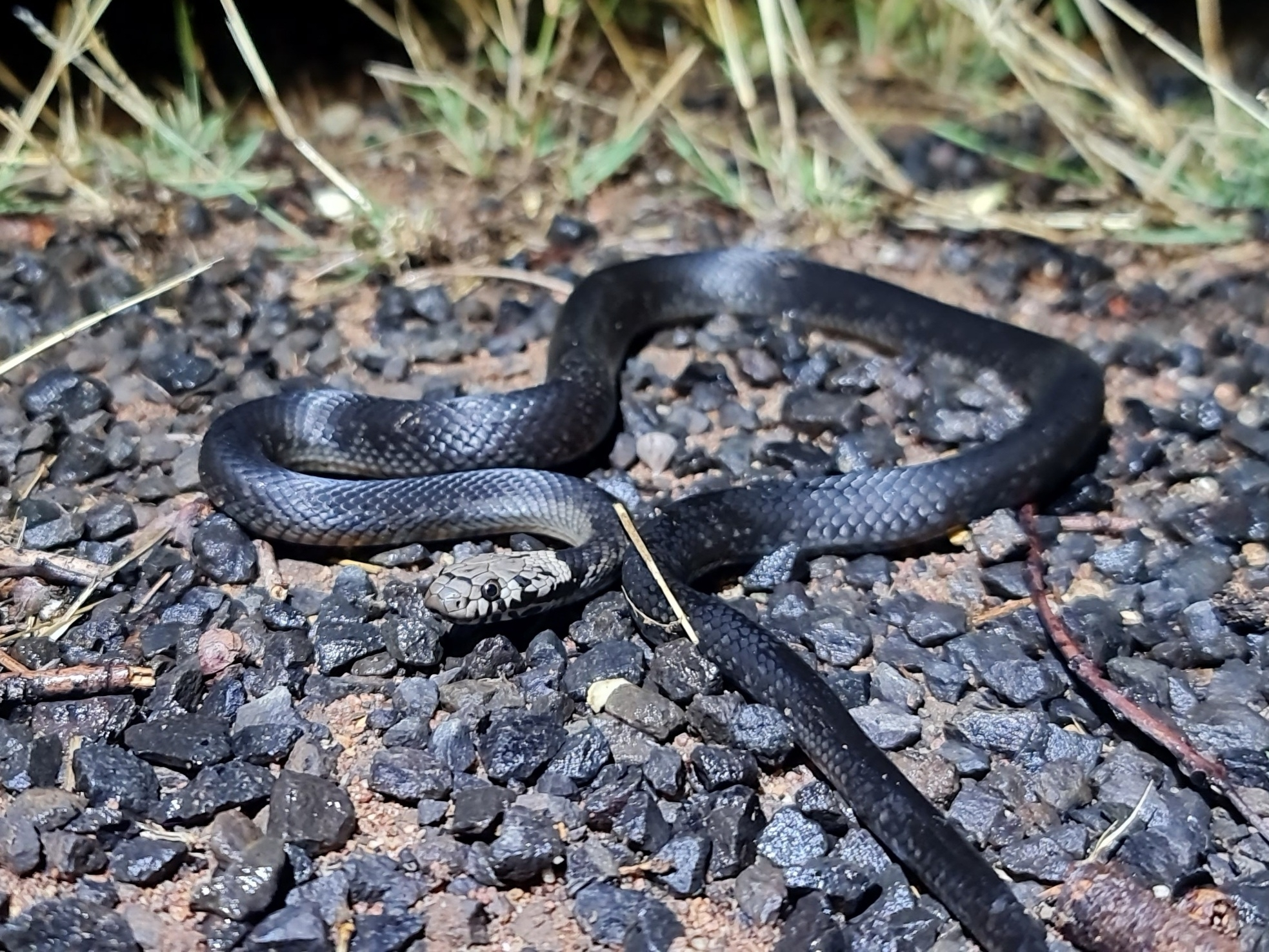

Conservation status
- Least Concern (IUCN 3.1)

Scientific classification
- Kingdom: Animalia
- Phylum: Chordata
- Class: Reptilia
- Order: Squamata
- Suborder: Serpentes
- Family: Elapidae
- Genus: Hoplocephalus
- Species: H. bitorquatus

Binomial name
- Hoplocephalus bitorquatus (Jan, 1859)

Synonyms
- Alecto bitorquata Jan, 1859; Hoplocephalus pallidiceps Kreft, 1869 (part); Hoplocephalus sulcans De Vis, 1884; Hoplocephalus waitii Ogilby, 1894; Hoplocephalus bitorquatus — Boulenger, 1896; Denisonia angulata De Vis, 1905; Denisonia revelata De Vis, 1911; Hoplocephalus bitorquatus — Cogger, 1983

= Pale-headed snake =

Species of snake

The pale-headed snake (Hoplocephalus bitorquatus) is a species of venomous snake in the family Elapidae. The species is endemic to Australia.

== Taxonomy ==
The species was originally described as Alecto bitorquata by Giorgio Jan in 1859.

== Description ==
H. bitorquatus may attain a total length of 90 cm (35 in), which includes a tail 9.5 cm (3.7 in) long. The top of the head is pale olive, with a bright yellow occipital blotch, which is edged with black. The body is dark olive dorsally, and may have a darker vertebral streak. Ventrally, it is greyish olive or brown.

== Distribution and habitat ==
H. bitorquatus is found on the eastern coast of Australia, from Cape York Peninsula in Queensland to Gosford in New South Wales. The preferred natural habitat of H. bitorquatus is forest.

== Behaviour ==
H. bitorquatus is arboreal.

== Diet ==
H. bitorquatus preys predominantly upon tree frogs, but also eats small lizards and small mammals.

== Reproduction ==
H. bitorquatus is viviparous.
