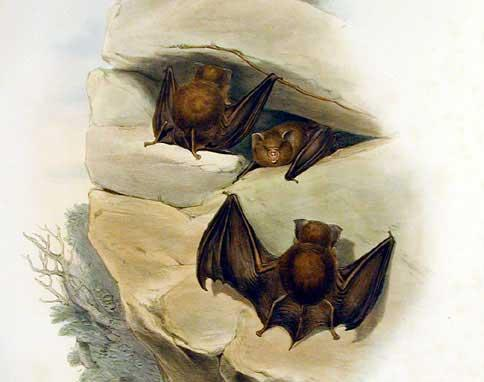
- Fawn leaf-nosed bat (H. cervinus)

Scientific classification
- Kingdom: Animalia
- Phylum: Chordata
- Class: Mammalia
- Order: Chiroptera
- Family: Hipposideridae
- Genus: Hipposideros; Gray, 1831

Type species
- Vespertilio speoris Schneider, 1800

Species
- See text

= Hipposideros =

Genus of bats

Hipposideros is one of the most diverse genera of bats, with more than 70 species. They are collectively called roundleaf bats after the shape of their nasal ornament. It is the type genus of the family Hipposideridae. It is divided into species groups based on morphology.

Some species that were previously placed in Hipposideros are now placed in the related genera Doryrhina and Macronycteris. Conversely, the genus Paracoelops, which was considered distinct until 2012, is now synonymized with Hipposideros, as the only species turned out to be based on a specimen of Hipposideros pomona.

== Species ==
=== armiger species group ===
- Great roundleaf bat, H. armiger
- Ha Long roundleaf bat, H. alongensis
- Pendlebury's roundleaf bat, H. pendleburyi
- Lesser great leaf-nosed bat, H. turpis

=== bicolor species group ===
- Dusky leaf-nosed bat, H. ater
- Benito roundleaf bat, H. beatus
- Bicolored roundleaf bat, H. bicolor
- Hipposideros brachyotus Dobson, 1874
- Short-headed roundleaf bat, H. breviceps
- Sundevall's roundleaf bat, H. caffer
- Spurred roundleaf bat, H. calcaratus
- Fawn leaf-nosed bat, H. cervinus
- Ashy roundleaf bat, H. cineraceus
- Large Mindanao roundleaf bat, H. coronatus
- Cox's roundleaf bat, H. coxi
- Timor roundleaf bat, H. crumeniferus
- Short-tailed roundleaf bat, H. curtus
- Borneo roundleaf bat, H. doriae
- Khajuria's leaf-nosed bat, H. durgadasi
- Dayak roundleaf bat, H. dyacorum
- Sooty roundleaf bat, H. fuliginosus
- Fulvus roundleaf bat, H. fulvus
- Cantor's roundleaf bat, H. galeritus
- Andersen's roundleaf bat, H. gentilis
- Thailand roundleaf bat, H. halophyllus
- Kolar leaf-nosed bat, H. hypophyllus
- Jones's roundleaf bat, H. jonesi
- Phou Khao Khouay leaf-nosed bat, H. khaokhouayensis
- Hipposideros kingstonae
- Hipposideros kunzi
- Lamotte's roundleaf bat, H. lamottei
- Big-eared roundleaf bat, H. macrobullatus
- Maggie Taylor's roundleaf bat, H. maggietaylorae
- Aellen's roundleaf bat, H. marisae
- Malayan roundleaf bat, H. nequam
- Nicobar leaf-nosed bat, H. nicobarulae
- Philippine forest roundleaf bat, H. obscurus
- Orbiculus leaf-nosed bat, H. orbiculus
- Biak roundleaf bat, H. papua
- Pomona roundleaf bat, H. pomona
- Philippine pygmy roundleaf bat, H. pygmaeus
- Ridley's leaf-nosed bat, H. ridleyi
- Laotian leaf-nosed bat, H. rotalis
- Noack's roundleaf bat, H. ruber
- Hipposideros srilankaensis

=== cyclops species group ===
This group no longer includes the cyclops roundleaf bat (Doryrhina cyclops), which is now placed in the separate genus Doryrhina.

- Telefomin roundleaf bat, H. corynophyllus
- Hill's roundleaf bat, H. edwardshilli
- Fly River roundleaf bat, H. muscinus
- Semon's roundleaf bat, H. semoni
- Northern leaf-nosed bat or narrow-eared roundleaf bat, H. stenotis

=== diadema species group ===
- Makira roundleaf bat, H. demissus
- Diadem roundleaf bat, H. diadema
- Fierce roundleaf bat, H. dinops
- Crested roundleaf bat, H. inexpectatus
- Arnhem leaf-nosed bat, H. inornatus
- Indian roundleaf bat, H. lankadiva
- Large Asian roundleaf bat, H. lekaguli
- Peleng leaf-nosed bat, H. pelingensis

=== larvatus species group ===
- Grand roundleaf bat, H. grandis
- Intermediate roundleaf bat, H. larvatus
- Maduran leaf-nosed bat, H. madurae
- Sorensen's leaf-nosed bat, H. sorenseni
- Sumba roundleaf bat or Sumban leaf-nosed bat, H. sumbae

=== megalotis species group ===
- Ethiopian large-eared roundleaf bat, H. megalotis

=== pratti species group ===
- Shield-faced roundleaf bat, H. lylei
- Pratt's roundleaf bat, H. pratti
- Swinhoe's roundleaf bat, H. swinhoei

=== speoris species group ===
- Aba roundleaf bat, H. abae
- Schneider's leaf-nosed bat, H. speoris

=== Uncertain group ===
- Hipposideros atrox
- Boeadi's roundleaf bat, H. boeadii
- Sulawesi roundleaf bat, H. celebensis
- Griffin's leaf-nosed bat, H. griffini
- Khasian leaf-nosed bat, H. khasiana
- Shield-nosed leaf-nosed bat H. scutinares
- Hipposideros tephrus
- House-dwelling leaf-nosed bat, H. einnaythu
- Wollaston's roundleaf bat, H. wollastoni

== Fossil species ==
The species Hipposideros bernardsigei Hand, 1997 describes one of many species of bats discovered in the north of Australia, the Riversleigh fauna, and appears to be a member of an Australopapuan group in an early radiation of the genus. The first hipposiderid to be described from Pliocene deposits at Riversleigh was Hipposideros winsburyorum Hand, 1999. Other named fossil species allied to Hipposideros include Hipposideros (Pseudorhinolophus), Hipposideros collongensis, Hipposideros conquensis, Hipposideros felix, Hipposideros minor, Hipposideros morloti, Hipposideros omani and Hipposideros schlosseri.
