= Lamotte's roundleaf bat =

Conservation status
- Critically Endangered (IUCN 3.1) iucn

Scientific classification
- Kingdom: Animalia
- Phylum: Chordata
- Class: Mammalia
- Order: Chiroptera
- Family: Hipposideridae
- Genus: Hipposideros
- Species: H. lamottei

Binomial name
- Hipposideros lamottei (Brosset, 1984)
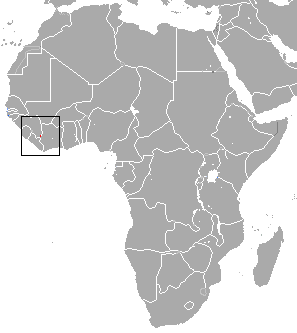
- Lamotte's Roundleaf Bat range

Species of mammal

Lamotte's roundleaf bat (Hipposideros lamottei) is a species of bat found only at Mount Nimba on the border of Côte d'Ivoire, Guinea and Liberia. It is critically endangered.

== Taxonomy ==
It was described as a new species in 1984 by French zoologist André Brosset. He chose the species name lamottei after Dr. Maxime Lamotte, who was also a French zoologist. Its status as a species has been called into question, and some suggested that it might be synonymous with Noack's roundleaf bat, Hipposideros ruber. While its mitochondrial gene for cytochrome b may only differ from that of H. ruber by only 6%, a 2013 study found that it was morphologically distinct from it. Based on its morphology, it is in the caffer/ruber species complex of its genus. Other species in this complex include:

- Sundevall's roundleaf bat, H. caffer
- Noack's roundleaf bat, H. ruber
- H. tephrus

Based on genetic analysis, it has been hypothesized that Lamotte's roundleaf bat has only recently become isolated from Noack's roundleaf bat, evolving to become a high-altitude specialist. Lamotte's roundleaf bat and other members of its species complex are members of the bicolor group of the genus Hipposideros. Other members of the bicolor group include:

- Dusky leaf-nosed bat, H. ater
- Benito roundleaf bat, H. beatus
- Bicolored roundleaf bat, H. bicolor
- Short-headed roundleaf bat, H. breviceps
- Spurred roundleaf bat, H. calcaratus
- Fawn leaf-nosed bat, H. cervinus
- Ashy roundleaf bat, H. cineraceus
- Large Mindanao roundleaf bat, H. coronatus
- Aba roundleaf bat, H. abae
- Cox's roundleaf bat, H. coxi
- Timor roundleaf bat, H. crumeniferus
- Short-tailed roundleaf bat, H. curtus
- Borneo roundleaf bat, H. doriae
- Khajuria's leaf-nosed bat, H. durgadasi
- Dayak roundleaf bat, H. dyacorum
- Sooty roundleaf bat, H. fuliginosus
- Fulvus roundleaf bat, H. fulvus
- Cantor's roundleaf bat, H. galeritus
- Thailand roundleaf bat, H. halophyllus
- Kolar leaf-nosed bat, H. hypophyllus
- Jones's roundleaf bat, H. jonesi
- Big-eared roundleaf bat, H. macrobullatus
- Maggie Taylor's roundleaf bat, H. maggietaylorae
- Aellen's roundleaf bat, H. marisae
- Malayan roundleaf bat, H. nequam
- Philippine forest roundleaf bat, H. obscurus
- Orbiculus leaf-nosed bat, H. orbiculus
- Biak roundleaf bat, H. papua
- Pomona roundleaf bat, H. pomona
- Philippine pygmy roundleaf bat, H. pygmaeus
- Ridley's leaf-nosed bat, H. ridleyi
- Laotian leaf-nosed bat, H. rotalis

== Description ==
It is a small bat with a nose-leaf. The nose-leaf has four small leaflets, two to either side. Its fur is brown, soft, and dense. Its ears are relatively short. Its patagia are blackish-brown. Its forearm is approximately 56.1 mm (2.21 in) long, and its hind foot is 9.3 mm (0.37 in) long. Its tail is 34.6–38.7 mm (1.36–1.52 in) long.

While many bats in the genus Hipposideros are similar in appearance, it can be differentiated by several characteristics: a forearm longer than 55 mm (2.2 in); large mastoid breadth; and small, gracile molars. It detects prey using echolocation, calling at maximum frequencies of 119 kHz, with a range of 118–120 kHz.

== Biology ==
During the day, it roosts in caves or mine shafts. It is known to share roosts with other species of bat, including Noack's roundleaf bat and the Angolan rousette. Based on its small teeth and relatively slender skull, it is thought that they might prey on soft-bodied insects. The examination of a small colony in December found no juveniles and no pregnant females, meaning that reproduction occurs at another time in the year. Little else is known about their reproduction.

== Range and habitat ==
It has only been recorded on Mount Nimba, which is situated on the border of Côte d'Ivoire, Guinea and Liberia. This mountain range is notable for its bat diversity; its bat diversity is possibly the greatest of the entire continent of Africa. All captures of this species have been limited to the Guinean side of the mountain, however. It has been recorded in two sites on Mount Nimba: one a lowland tropical rainforest, the other an afromontane savanna. It has been recorded at elevations of 500–1,400 m (1,600–4,600 ft) above sea level. Four mine adits currently in use for roosts are greater than 1,200 m (3,900 ft) above sea level, however, while there is only one record of this species from a lower altitude. These more recent records suggest that it prefers the afromontane savanna, only occasionally traveling to the lowland rainforests.

== Conservation ==
It is listed as a critically endangered species by the IUCN, as of 2020. It meets the criteria for this designation because its extent of occurrence is likely less than 100 km^{2} (39 mi^{2}), its area of occupancy is likely less than 10 km^{2} (3.9 mi^{2}), and all individuals live in a single location. Its population is thought to be in decline. It was first evaluated by the IUCN in 1996, when it was listed as data deficient; it has been listed as critically endangered since 2004. Threats to this species include mining for iron ore, which can disturb or destroy their roosts. As of 2013, however, there were indications that mining would soon begin at the only sites where this species exists, posing an imminent threat to its existence. Its range is also subject to habitat destruction via deforestation.

In this region, bats are also used as a food source, so this bat is likely killed for bushmeat. At least some of its range is encompassed by Mount Nimba Strict Nature Reserve, which confers some protections, though these protections may not be strictly enforced. Due to its imperiled status, it is identified by the Alliance for Zero Extinction as a species in danger of imminent extinction. In 2013, Bat Conservation International listed this species as one of the 35 species of its worldwide priority list of conservation. Lamotte's roundleaf bat was specifically named in an article that argued against collecting zoological specimens from critically endangered bat species, or at least promoted more restrictions on who could collect specimens and how many individuals they could collect.
