= Crested roundleaf bat =

Conservation status
- Data Deficient (IUCN 3.1)

Scientific classification
- Kingdom: Animalia
- Phylum: Chordata
- Class: Mammalia
- Order: Chiroptera
- Family: Hipposideridae
- Genus: Macronycteris
- Species: H. inexpectatus

Binomial name
- Hipposideros inexpectatus Laurie & Hill, 1954
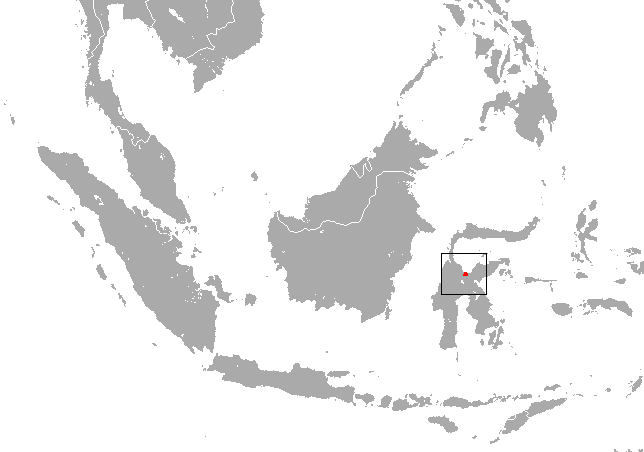
- Crested roundleaf bat range

Species of bat

The crested roundleaf bat (Hipposideros inexpectatus) is a species of bat in the family Hipposideridae. It is endemic to Indonesia.

== Taxonomy ==
The crested roundleaf bat was described as a new species in 1954 by Eleanor M. O. Laurie and John Edwards Hill. The holotype had been collected near Poso which is a city on the Indonesian island of Sulawesi. As the genus Hipposideros is very speciose, it is divided into species groups based on morphology. The crested roundleaf abt was placed into the diadema species group.

== Description ==
Laurie and Hill considered it to be very large compared to other members of the diadema species group. They wrote that its nose-leaf and ears were similar in appearance to those of the fierce roundleaf bat, H. dinops. Its nose-leaf has four smaller, supplementary nose-leaves that project laterally. The holotype, an individual preserved in alcohol, had a forearm length of 100.8 mm (3.97 in).

== Range and habitat ==
It is endemic to Sulawesi where it has been documented in three localities: one in Central Sulawesi, and two in Northern Sulawesi.

== Conservation ==
As of 2016, it is evaluated as a data deficient species by the IUCN. It meets the criteria for this classification because it is a poorly known species and any threats that it faces are unknown. It has only been documented once since the 19th century; therefore, its population size and distribution are not known.
