= Hipposideros bernardsigei =

Hipposideros bernardsigei Temporal range: Miocene

Scientific classification
- Domain: Eukaryota
- Kingdom: Animalia
- Phylum: Chordata
- Class: Mammalia
- Order: Chiroptera
- Family: Hipposideridae
- Genus: Hipposideros
- Species: H. bernardsigei

Binomial name
- Hipposideros bernardsigei Hand, 1997

Extinct species of bat

Hipposideros bernardsigei is a hipposiderid species of bat known by fossil specimens, one of the many new taxa of microchiropterans discovered in the Riversleigh World Heritage Area.

== Taxonomy ==
The description of Hipposideros bernardsigei was published in 1997 by Suzanne J. Hand, assigning the species to the genus Hipposideros. The type locality is the Neville's Garden Site at the Riversleigh fossil area. The specific honours the palaeontologist Bernard Sigé for his work on fossil hipposiderid species.

== Description ==
A species of the Hipposideridae, known as Old World leaf-nosed bats, a microbat that used echolocation to forage for prey. Hipposideros bernardsigei appears to be closely related to other Australopapuan species of the genus, named as the Hipposideros muscinus group or allied with taxa that also occur on the African continent, named as the Hipposideros cyclops group. The species probably roosted in a limestone cave that was associated with a pool or lake in the rainforest that dominated the area.
