= Shield-nosed leaf-nosed bat =

Conservation status
- Vulnerable (IUCN 3.1)

Scientific classification
- Kingdom: Animalia
- Phylum: Chordata
- Class: Mammalia
- Order: Chiroptera
- Family: Hipposideridae
- Genus: Hipposideros
- Species: H. scutinares

Binomial name
- Hipposideros scutinares Robinson, Jenkins, Francis & Fulford, 2003
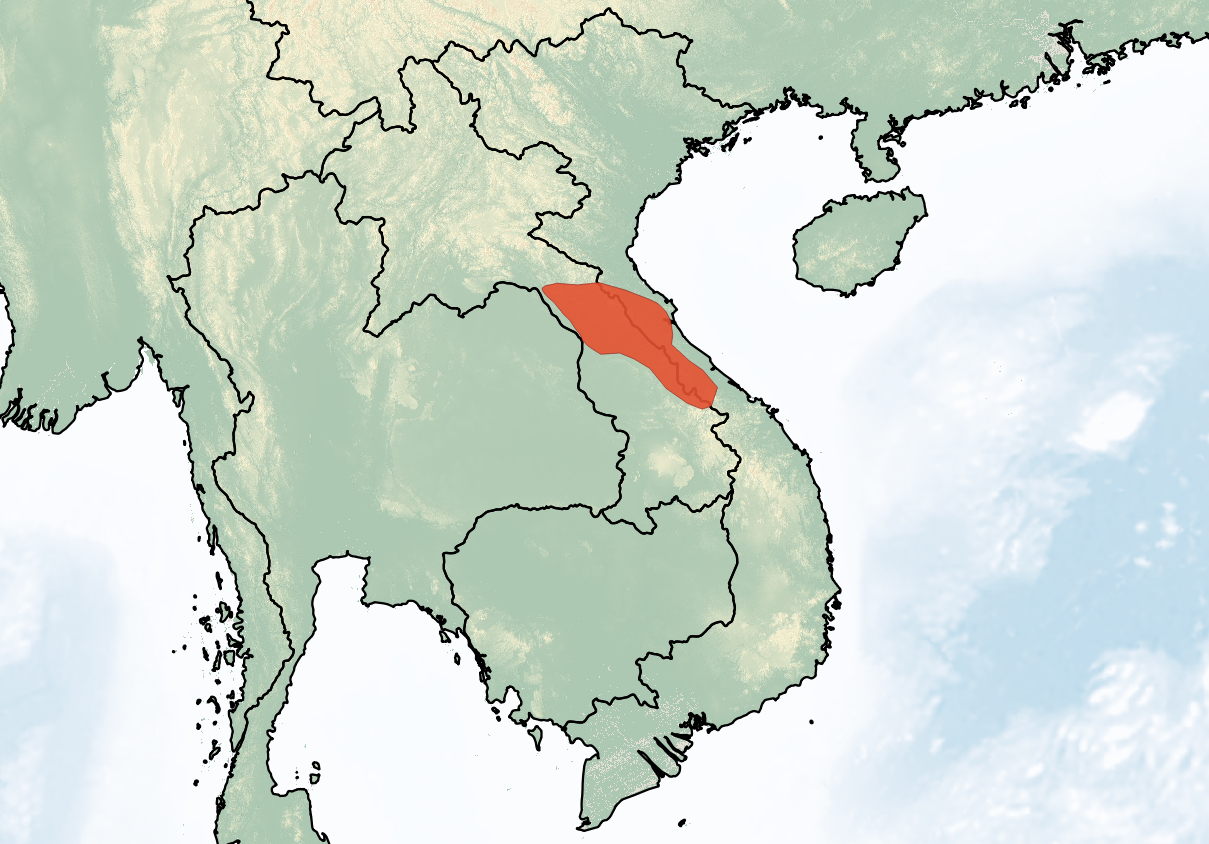

Species of bat

The shield-nosed leaf-nosed bat or shield-nosed roundleaf bat (Hipposideros scutinares) is a bat from Laos and Vietnam.

== Taxonomy ==
In their initial description for H. scutinares, Mark F. Robinson and colleagues placed this species in the H. pratti group, which also includes Pratt's roundleaf bat (H. pratti) and the shield-faced roundleaf bat (H. lylei).

== Distribution ==
The specimens examined in the initial species description came from six locations in central Laos and two locations from Vietnam. The type locality is Ban Khankeo on the upper Nam Hinboun River in Khammouane Province, (Note: The original description listed the type location's province as Bolikhamsai Province, but the province is in fact Khammouan Province.) Laos (17°58′N 104°49′E). It was subsequently recorded in Cha Noi Cave, Phong Nha-Kẻ Bàng National Park, Vietnam.

== Name ==
The specific epithet comes from the Latin scutum "shield" and nares "nostrils". It is known by the common names "shield-nosed leaf-nosed bat" and "shield-nosed roundleaf bat". Its name in Vietnamese is dơi nếp mũi đông dương.
