= Boeadi's roundleaf bat =

Conservation status
- Data Deficient (IUCN 3.1)

Scientific classification
- Kingdom: Animalia
- Phylum: Chordata
- Class: Mammalia
- Order: Chiroptera
- Family: Hipposideridae
- Genus: Hipposideros
- Species: H. boeadii

Binomial name
- Hipposideros boeadii Bates, Rossiter, Suyanto, Kingston, 2007

Species of bat

Boeadi's roundleaf bat (Hipposideros boeadii) is a species of roundleaf bat found in Indonesia.

== Taxonomy and etymology ==
Boeadi's roundleaf bat was described as a new species in 2007. The holotype, an adult female, was collected in August 2000 on Sulawesi. The eponym for the species name "boeadii" is Indonesian zoologist Boeadi, "in recognition of his long-standing contribution to bat research in Indonesia."

== Description ==
It is a small- to medium-sized roundleaf bat, with a forearm length of 40.5–42.7 mm (1.59–1.68 in) and a weight of 6.8–8.5 g (0.24–0.30 oz). Its fur is reddish-brown over its whole body. Its ears, nose-leaf, and flight membranes are all dark brown or blackish.

== Range and habitat ==
The type locality of this species is Rawa Aopa Watumohai National Park in Indonesia. All individuals of the type series were documented in lowland rainforest, 1–4 km (0.62–2.49 mi) from savanna habitat. Its estimated extent of occurrence is 382 km^{2} (147 mi^{2}).

== Conservation ==
As of 2016, Boeadi's roundleaf bat is listed as a data deficient species by the IUCN. Any threats that this species faces are unknown.
