= Hipposideros felix =

Hipposideros felix Temporal range: Miocene

Scientific classification
- Kingdom: Animalia
- Phylum: Chordata
- Class: Mammalia
- Order: Chiroptera
- Family: Hipposideridae
- Genus: Hipposideros
- Species: H. felix

Binomial name
- Hipposideros felix Ginsburg and Mein, 1997

Species of bat

Hipposideros felix is a species of bat known from Miocene fossil deposits at Li Mae Long in Thailand. The holotype is a tooth, the third molar, of a hipposiderid bat with affinities to the Brachipposideros group of fossil species found in Australia and France. The first description was published in a study of mammal specimens at the fossil site that produced evidence of unknown species, including other bats. The species is only known from the Li Mae Long, a site that was determined to be a forest near an open body of water in the Miocene. The authors, Léonard Ginsburg and Pierre Mein, proposed the specific epithet felix, derived from Latin, as a reference to the regions cultural perception of a bat as a symbol of happiness and good fortune.
