= Peleng leaf-nosed bat =

Conservation status
- Near Threatened (IUCN 3.1)

Scientific classification
- Kingdom: Animalia
- Phylum: Chordata
- Class: Mammalia
- Order: Chiroptera
- Family: Hipposideridae
- Genus: Macronycteris
- Species: H. pelingensis

Binomial name
- Hipposideros pelingensis Shamel, 1940
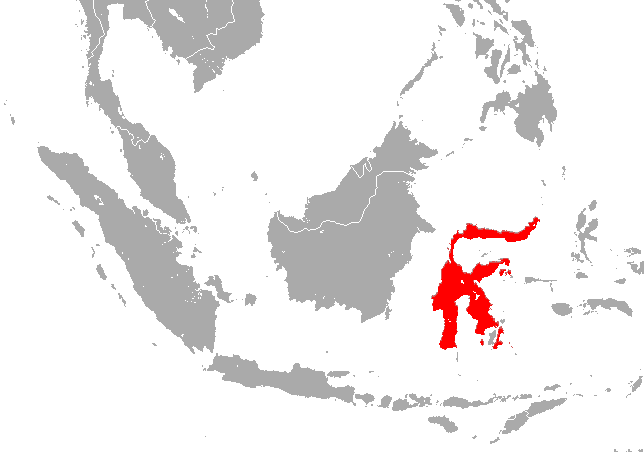

Species of bat

The Peleng leaf-nosed bat (Hipposideros pelingensis) is a species of bat native to Sulawesi and other adjacent Indonesian islands. It has been recorded in Marus National Park and Lambu Sango National Reserve.

== Taxonomy and etymology ==
It was described as a new species in 1940 by mammalogist H. Harold Shamel. The holotype had been collected in 1918 by H. C. Raven. Its species name "pelingensis" is Latin for "belonging to Peling." Shamel was using an incorrect alternate spelling of the island of Peleng, which is where the holotype was collected. The Principle of Priority, which is a rule of nomenclature, means that Shamel's species name will be retained as he wrote it, though the common name can change to reflect the accurate spelling. At times in the past, it has been considered a subspecies of the fierce roundleaf bat, Hipposideros dinops.

== Habitat and ecology ==
This bat roosts in karsts and caves in large groups ranging from hundreds to thousands of individuals.

== Conservation ==
The IUCN lists the Peleng leaf-nosed bat as near threatened. It meets the criteria for this assessment because it is facing significant threats that may cause severe population declines in the near future. It almost qualifies for the more-threatened classification of vulnerable. Limestone extraction from cement companies contributes to the decline of available homes to these bats.
