= Hipposideros winsburyorum =

Hipposideros winsburyorum Temporal range: Pliocene

Scientific classification
- Domain: Eukaryota
- Kingdom: Animalia
- Phylum: Chordata
- Class: Mammalia
- Order: Chiroptera
- Family: Hipposideridae
- Genus: Hipposideros
- Species: H. winsburyorum

Binomial name
- Hipposideros winsburyorum Hand, 1999.

Extinct species of bat

Hipposideros winsburyorum is a hipposiderid species of bat known by fossil specimens, one of the many new taxa of chiropterans discovered in the Riversleigh World Heritage Area. The species existed during the Pliocene.

== Taxonomy ==
The description of Hipposideros winsburyorum was published in 1999 by Suzanne J. Hand and Henk Godthelp, assigning the species to the genus Hipposideros. The type locality is the Neville's Garden Site at the Riversleigh fossil area. The registration of specimen, the maxilla numbered QM F30575, was inadvertently applied to several pieces of fossil material discovered at Riversleigh, a species of Mormopterus and a molar attributed to the Miocene Icarops aenae.

The specific epithet honours supporters of research at Riversleigh, Janet and Keith Winsbury.

== Description ==
A species of the Hipposideridae, known as Old World leaf-nosed bats, a microbat that used echolocation to forage for prey. The species probably roosted in a limestone cave that was associated with a pool or lake in the rainforest that dominated the area.

The species, as with other hipposiderids, is represented in fossil record of the Riversleigh fauna, but is only known from that area. The karst system created by the Gregory River provided Hipposideros winsburyorum with an ideal environment for refuge and foraging opportunities.
