= Madanycteris =

Madanycteris Temporal range: Tortonian

Scientific classification
- Kingdom: Animalia
- Phylum: Chordata
- Class: Mammalia
- Infraclass: Placentalia
- Order: Chiroptera
- Family: Hipposideridae
- Genus: †Madanycteris
- Species: †M. razana

Binomial name
- †Madanycteris razana Samonds et al., 2025

Extinct genus of bats

Madanycteris is an extinct genus of hipposiderid chiropteran that lived during the Tortonian stage of the Miocene epoch.

== Distribution ==
Madanycteris razana is known from Madagascar.
