= Aellen's roundleaf bat =

Conservation status
- Vulnerable (IUCN 3.1)

Scientific classification
- Kingdom: Animalia
- Phylum: Chordata
- Class: Mammalia
- Order: Chiroptera
- Family: Hipposideridae
- Genus: Macronycteris
- Species: H. marisae

Binomial name
- Hipposideros marisae Aellen, 1954
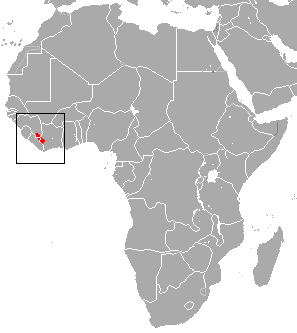
- Aellen's Roundleaf Bat range

Species of bat

Aellen's roundleaf bat (Hipposideros marisae) is a species of bat in the family Hipposideridae. It is found in Ivory Coast, Guinea, and Liberia. Its natural habitats are subtropical and tropical forests and caves.

== Taxonomy and etymology ==
It was described as a new species in 1954 by Villy Aellen. The eponym for the species name "marisae" was Aellen's wife (her name was presumably Marisa). Of the name, Aellen wrote, "Dédiée à ma femme qui m'a accompagné et secondé au cours de ce voyage," which translates to: "Dedicated to my wife who accompanied and assisted me on this trip."

== Description ==
It is a small species of horseshoe bat, with a forearm length of 41 mm (1.6 in). It has long ears. Its fur is uniformly dark gray, while its ears and wing membranes are dark brown. Its nose-leaf is black around the edges, with a light brown sella.

== Range and habitat ==
It is known from several countries in West Africa, including Ivory Coast, Guinea, and Liberia.

== Conservation ==
It is currently evaluated as vulnerable by the IUCN.
