= Maduran leaf-nosed bat =

Conservation status
- Near Threatened (IUCN 3.1)

Scientific classification
- Kingdom: Animalia
- Phylum: Chordata
- Class: Mammalia
- Order: Chiroptera
- Family: Hipposideridae
- Genus: Macronycteris
- Species: H. madurae

Binomial name
- Hipposideros madurae Kitchener & Maryanto, 1993
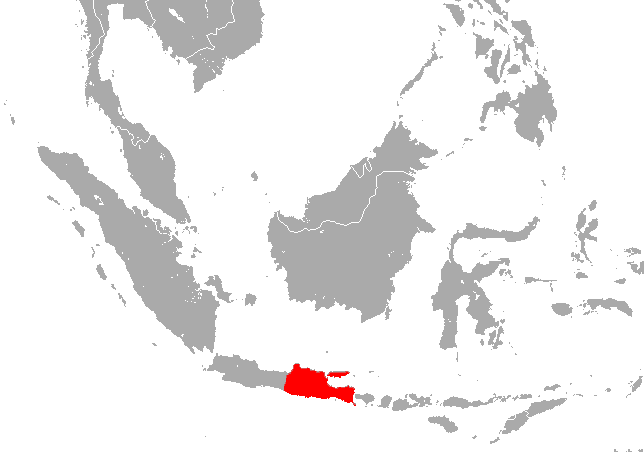
- Maduran leaf-nosed bat range

Species of bat

The Maduran leaf-nosed bat (Hipposideros madurae) is a species of bat in the family Hipposideridae endemic to Indonesia. This species is known from the eastern half of Java and on Madura Island. It is found below 1,000 metres (3,300 ft). It is an IUCN Red List Near Threatened species, with the status changed from Least Concern after a 2021 assessment.

== Taxonomy and etymology ==
It was described as a new species in 1993 by Kitchener and Maryanto. Its species name "madurae" was derived from Madura Island where the holotype was collected.
