= Khasian leaf-nosed bat =

Conservation status
- Data Deficient (IUCN 3.1)

Scientific classification
- Kingdom: Animalia
- Phylum: Chordata
- Class: Mammalia
- Infraclass: Placentalia
- Order: Chiroptera
- Family: Hipposideridae
- Genus: Hipposideros
- Species: H. khasiana

Binomial name
- Hipposideros khasiana Thabah, Rossiter, Kingston, Zhang, Parsons, Mya, Zubaid & Jones, 2006

Species of bat

The Khasian leaf-nosed bat (Hipposideros khasiana) is a species of bat in the family Hipposideridae. It is endemic to Meghalaya, India. It is a cave-dwelling bat.

== Taxonomy ==
The species was earlier considered a population of H. larvatus. However. it has now been elevated to species level on the basis of different echolocation call frequencies and genetic divergence.

The holotype for the species was collected in the Tem-Dibai Cave.

== Biology ==
=== Echolocation ===
The bat's echolocation is a part of the 85 kHz phonic type.

== Habitat and distribution ==
The species has only been observed roosting in caves in the Khasi Hills in India. According to Mark A. Jobling in a paper about investigative genetics, the Khasian Leaf-nosed bat is an extremely rare and localized species with the chances of encountering one being very low.

== Conservation ==
The bat is considered data deficient due to the lack of substantial information regarding its habits and distribution. Its known habitat is not part of any protected area.
