= Hipposideros alongensis =

Conservation status
- Vulnerable (IUCN 3.1)

Scientific classification
- Kingdom: Animalia
- Phylum: Chordata
- Class: Mammalia
- Order: Chiroptera
- Family: Hipposideridae
- Genus: Macronycteris
- Species: H. alongensis

Binomial name
- Hipposideros alongensis Bourret, 1942

Species of bat

Hipposideros alongensis, known as the Ha Long leaf-nosed bat, is a species of bat in the family Hipposideridae. It is endemic to Vietnam. It is listed as a vulnerable species by the IUCN.

== Taxonomy ==
The species was formerly known as a subspecies of H. turpis. It is now formally described as a distinct species.

There are two subspecies:

- Bourret's leaf-nosed bat (H. a. alongensis)
- Sung's leaf-nosed bat (H. a. sungi)

== Distribution and habitat ==
The species is only found in the karst habitats of northeastern Vietnam, and is primarily a cave-dweller, although it is also known to be spotted in forests. It is found from an altitude of 3–523 m (10–1,716 ft).

Of the two subspecies, Bourret's leaf-nosed bat is found in the Cat Ba and Bai Tu Long national parks and Sung's leaf-nosed bat is found in the Cuc Phuong and Ba Be national parks and the Huu Lien and Na Hang nature reserves.

== Conservation ==
In the most recent published assessment, the species is listed as a vulnerable species. It has a population of 8,000-10,000 individuals, and colonies are known to be as big as 500 individuals, although most are considerably smaller. Tourism and habitat loss, including vegetation around its main colony, are the main threats to the species. Along with the construction of lights and routes inside caves for cave tourism, these have led to rapid losses of population for the species. The species also faces illegal hunting by some locals.

There is no government-backed effort to protect the species.
