= Hipposideros einnaythu =

Conservation status
- Data Deficient (IUCN 3.1)

Scientific classification
- Kingdom: Animalia
- Phylum: Chordata
- Class: Mammalia
- Order: Chiroptera
- Family: Hipposideridae
- Genus: Hipposideros
- Species: H. einnaythu

Binomial name
- Hipposideros einnaythu Douangboubpha, Bumrungsri, Satasook, Soisook, Bu, Aul, Harrison, Pearch, Thomas and Bates, 2011

Species of mammal

Hipposideros einnaythu, the house-dwelling leaf-nosed bat, is a species of bat found in Myanmar.

== Taxonomy ==
The holotype specimen used to describe this species is a female collected in 2010 at the sea level, in the state Rakhine State, Myanmar. This new species was clearly distinguished from two other species of Hipposideros previously known in the region: Hipposideros nicobarulae and Hipposideros ater.

== Range and habitat ==
All the specimens recorded so far were found in human habitations.

== Literature cited ==
- Douangboubpha, B., S. Bumrungsri, C. Satasook, P. Soisook, Si Si Hla Bu, B. Aul, D.L. Harrison, M. Pearch, N.M. Thomas, and P.J.J. Bates. 2011. A new species of small Hipposideros(Chiroptera: Hipposideridae) from Myanmar and a revaluation of the taxon H. nicobarulae Miller, 1902 from the Nicobar Islands. Acta Chiropterologica, 13(1): 61-78.
