= Ethiopian large-eared roundleaf bat =

Conservation status
- Least Concern (IUCN 3.1)

Scientific classification
- Kingdom: Animalia
- Phylum: Chordata
- Class: Mammalia
- Order: Chiroptera
- Family: Hipposideridae
- Genus: Macronycteris
- Species: H. megalotis

Binomial name
- Hipposideros megalotis (Heuglin, 1862)
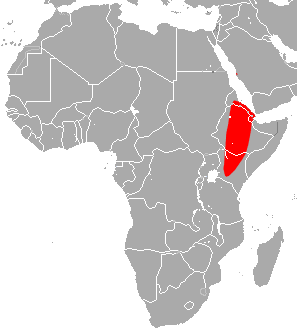
- Ethiopian large-eared roundleaf bat range

Synonyms
- Phyllorrhina megalotis Heuglin, 1862; Phyllorhina megalotis Heuglin, 1862

Species of bat

The Ethiopian large-eared roundleaf bat (Hipposideros megalotis) is a species of bat in the family Hipposideridae. It is found in Djibouti, Eritrea, Ethiopia, Kenya, Saudi Arabia, and Somalia. Its natural habitats are dry savanna, subtropical or tropical dry shrubland, caves, and hot deserts.

== Taxonomy and etymology ==
It was described as a new species in 1862 by German ornithologist Theodor von Heuglin. Von Heuglin placed it in the now-defunct genus Phyllorrhina (misspelling of Phyllorhina), with a scientific name of Phyllorrhina megalotis. Its species name "megalotis" means "long-eared."

== Biology and range ==
It is nocturnal, roosting in sheltered places during the day such as man-made structures. It also possibly uses caves for roosts. It has been found in Djibouti, Eritrea, Ethiopia, Kenya, and Saudi Arabia. It has been found at elevations up to 2,000 m (6,600 ft).

== Conservation ==
It is currently assessed as least concern by the IUCN—its lowest conservation priority.
