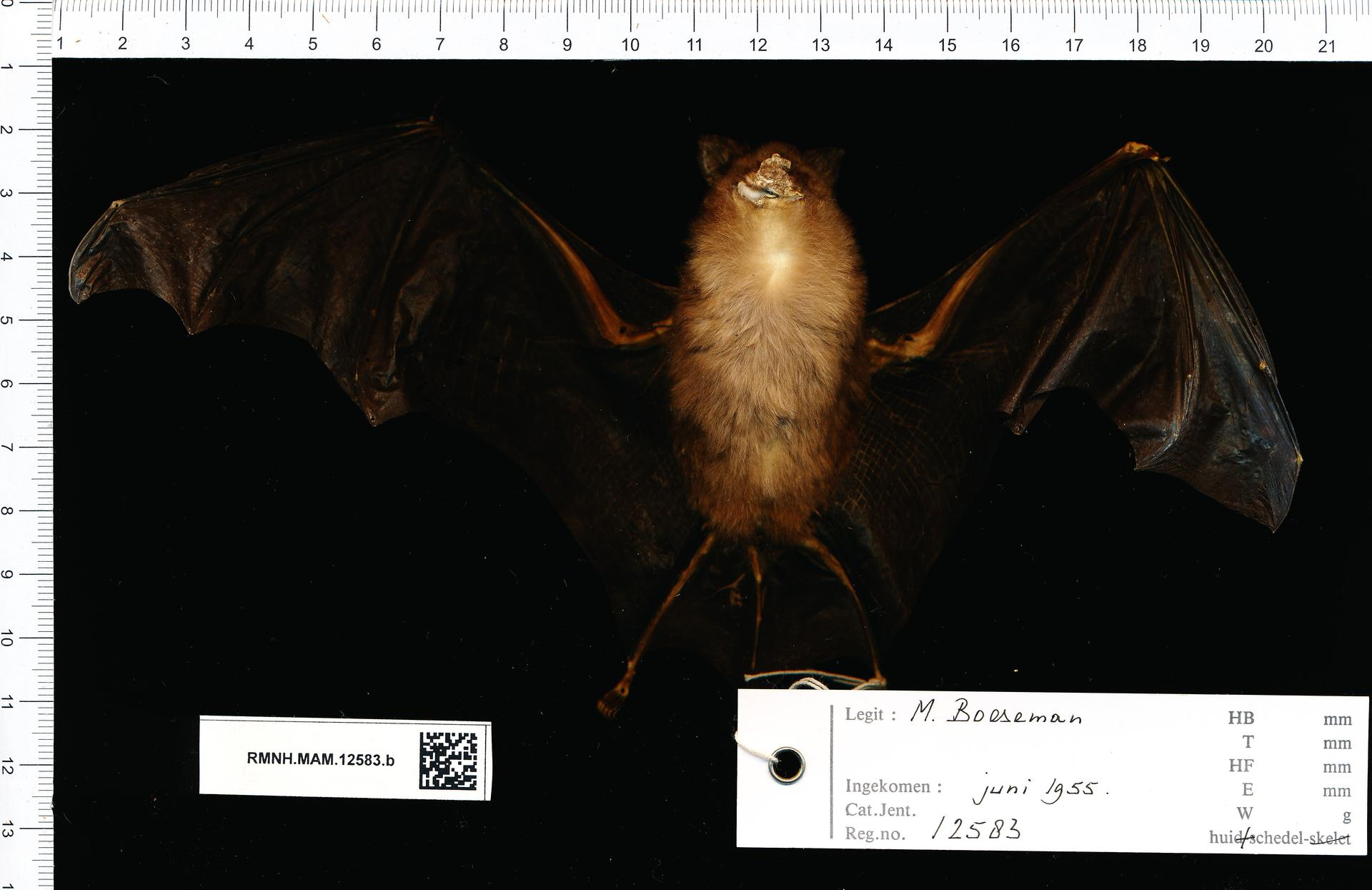

Conservation status
- Least Concern (IUCN 3.1)

Scientific classification
- Kingdom: Animalia
- Phylum: Chordata
- Class: Mammalia
- Order: Chiroptera
- Family: Hipposideridae
- Genus: Macronycteris
- Species: H. papua

Binomial name
- Hipposideros papua (Thomas & Doria, 1886)
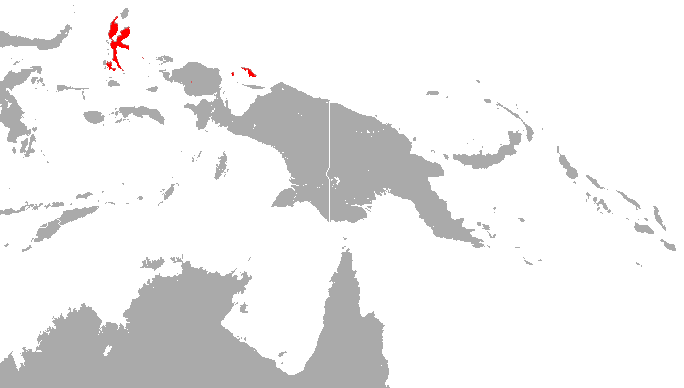
- Biak roundleaf bat range

Synonyms
- Phyllorhina papua Thomas & Doria, 1886

= Biak roundleaf bat =

Species of bat

The Biak roundleaf bat or Geelvinck Bay leaf-nosed bat (Hipposideros papua) is a species of bat in the family Hipposideridae. It is endemic to the Biak Islands (Schouten Islands) and Cenderawasih Bay (Geelvinck Bay) area of Papua Province, located in Western New Guinea, Indonesia.

== Taxonomy and etymology ==
It was described as a new species in 1886 by British zoologist Oldfield Thomas and Italian naturalist Giacomo Doria. They initially placed it in the now-defunct genus Phyllorhina, with the scientific name Phyllorhina papua. Its species name "papua" references Papua New Guinea where Odoardo Beccari collected the holotype.

== Description ==
It has a forearm length of approximately 50.5 mm (1.99 in). It has a nose-leaf with two lateral leaflets.

It is nocturnal, roosting in sheltered places during the day such as caves.

== Range and status ==
It is endemic to Indonesia. Its range encompasses several islands of Indonesia, including Halmahera, Bacan, Gebe, Biak, Supiori, Numfoor, and Vogelkop Peninsula of New Guinea.

As of 2021, it was evaluated as least concern by the IUCN—its lowest conservation priority.
