= Telefomin roundleaf bat =

Conservation status
- Least Concern (IUCN 3.1)

Scientific classification
- Kingdom: Animalia
- Phylum: Chordata
- Class: Mammalia
- Order: Chiroptera
- Family: Hipposideridae
- Genus: Macronycteris
- Species: H. corynophyllus

Binomial name
- Hipposideros corynophyllus Hill, 1985
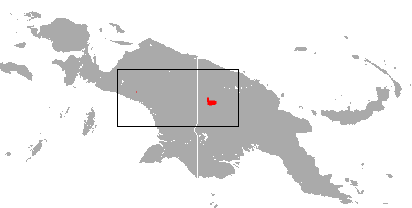
- Telefomin roundleaf bat range

Species of bat

The Telefomin roundleaf bat (Hipposideros corynophyllus) is a species of bat in the family Hipposideridae. It is found in West Papua (Indonesia) and Papua New Guinea.
