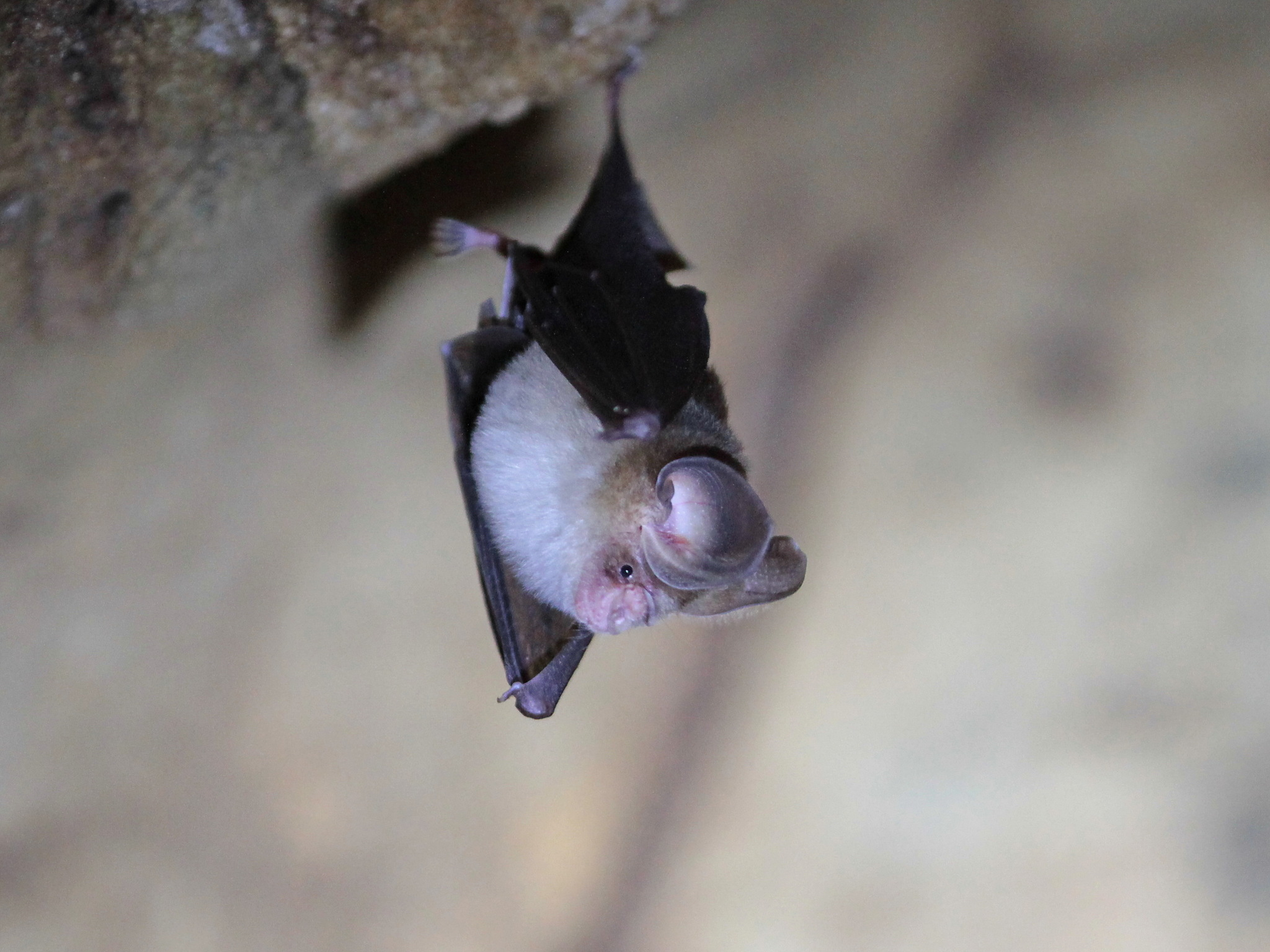

Conservation status
- Least Concern (IUCN 3.1)

Scientific classification
- Kingdom: Animalia
- Phylum: Chordata
- Class: Mammalia
- Infraclass: Placentalia
- Order: Chiroptera
- Family: Hipposideridae
- Genus: Hipposideros
- Species: H. cineraceus

Binomial name
- Hipposideros cineraceus Blyth, 1853
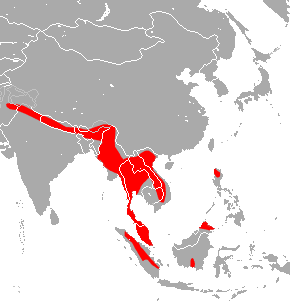
- Ashy roundleaf bat range

= Ashy roundleaf bat =

Species of bat

The ashy roundleaf bat (Hipposideros cineraceus) is a species of bat in the family Hipposideridae found in Bhutan, Cambodia, India, Indonesia, Laos, Malaysia, Myanmar, Nepal, Pakistan, Thailand, and Vietnam.

== Taxonomy and etymology ==
It was described as a new species in 1853 by English zoologist Edward Blyth. The holotype had been collected by William Theobald near the Salt Range in Bhera, Pakistan. Its species name "cineraceus" is derived from Latin "cinereus," meaning "ashen." Blyth described parts of its fur as "greyish-white."

== Description ==
It is a small species of bat, with individuals weighing 4–5.5 g (0.14–0.19 oz). Its forearm length is 36–40.5 mm (1.42–1.59 in). It has a simple nose-leaf with a raised bump on the nasal septum.

== Biology and ecology ==
It roosts in sheltered places such as caves during the day.

== Range and habitat ==
Its range includes several countries in South and Southeast Asia. It has been documented in Cambodia, India, Indonesia, Laos, Malaysia, Myanmar, Pakistan, Thailand, and Vietnam. It has been documented at a range of elevations from 62–1,480 m (203–4,856 ft) above sea level.

== Conservation ==
As of 2019, it is assessed as a least-concern species by the IUCN.
