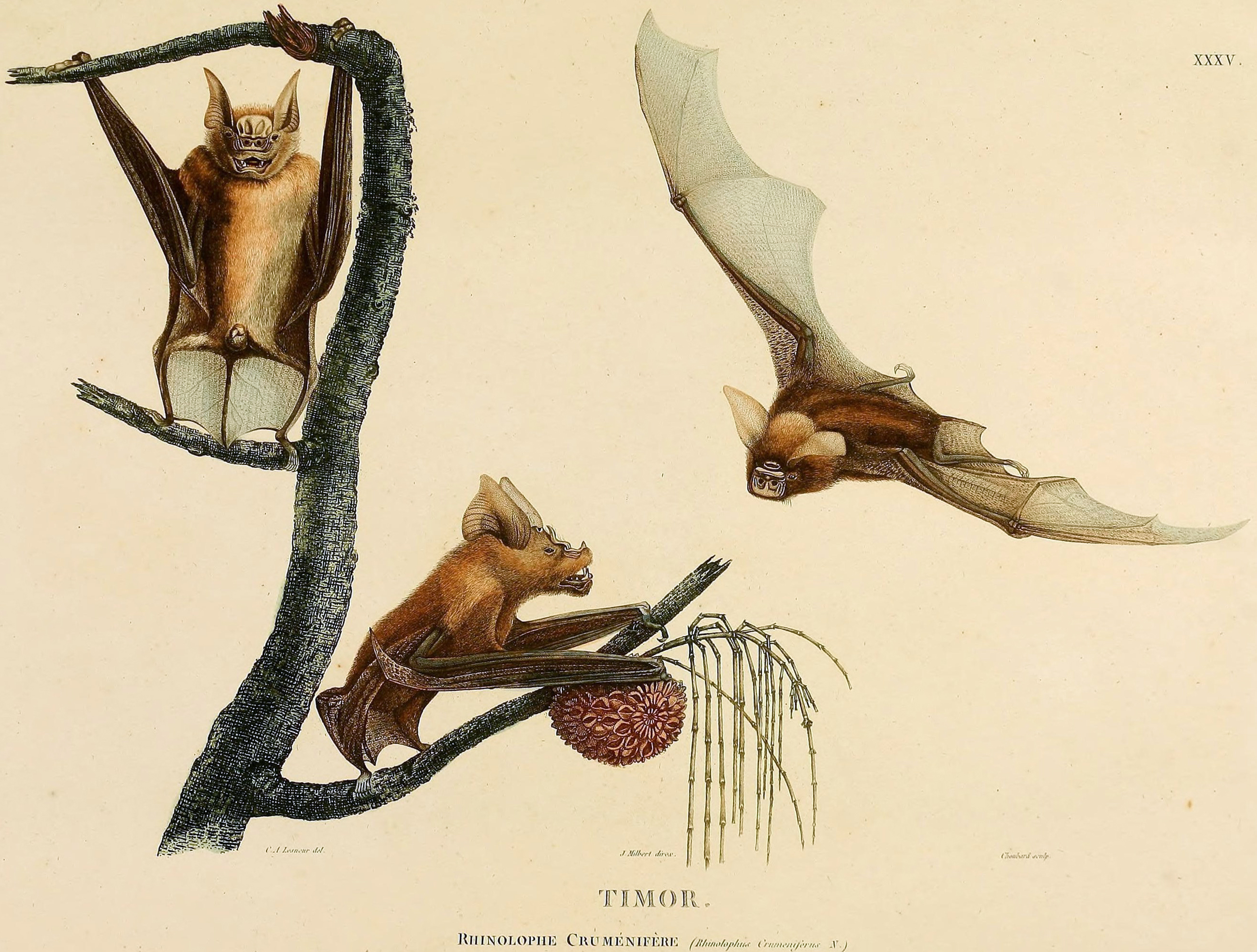
- 1807 illustration

Conservation status
- Data Deficient (IUCN 3.1)

Scientific classification
- Kingdom: Animalia
- Phylum: Chordata
- Class: Mammalia
- Order: Chiroptera
- Family: Hipposideridae
- Genus: Macronycteris
- Species: H. crumeniferus

Binomial name
- Hipposideros crumeniferus Lesueur & Petit, 1807
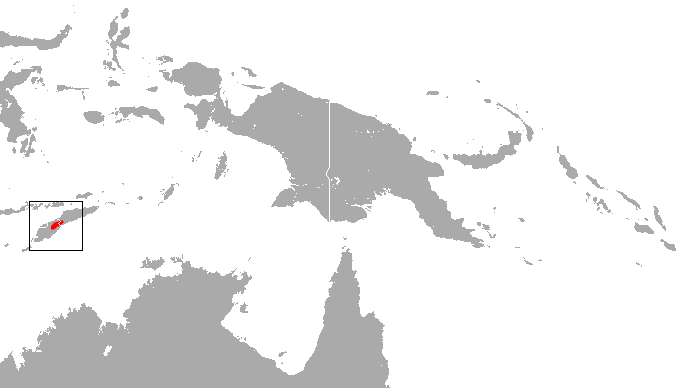
- Timor roundleaf bat range

= Timor roundleaf bat =

Species of bat

The Timor roundleaf bat (Hipposideros crumeniferus) is a species of bat in the family Hipposideridae. It is endemic to Indonesia and Timor-Leste.
