= Philippine forest roundleaf bat =

Conservation status
- Least Concern (IUCN 3.1)

Scientific classification
- Kingdom: Animalia
- Phylum: Chordata
- Class: Mammalia
- Order: Chiroptera
- Family: Hipposideridae
- Genus: Hipposideros
- Species: H. obscurus

Binomial name
- Hipposideros obscurus (Peters, 1861)
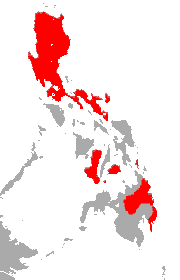
- Philippine forest roundleaf bat range

Synonyms
- Phyllorhina obscura Peters, 1861

Species of bat

The Philippine forest roundleaf bat (Hipposideros obscurus) is a species of bat in the family Hipposideridae. It is endemic to the Philippines and is assessed as least concern by the IUCN.

== Taxonomy and etymology ==
It was described as a new species in 1861 by German naturalist Wilhelm Peters. Peters initially placed it in the now-defunct genus Phyllorhina, with the scientific name Phyllorhina obscura. Its species name "obscurus" is Latin for "dark".

== Habitat and distribution ==
The species depends on primary and disturbed lowland forest. Its population has probably been reduced by lowland forest clearance, but it is known to persist in secondary forest.
