= Hipposideros rotalis =

Conservation status
- Least Concern (IUCN 3.1)

Scientific classification
- Kingdom: Animalia
- Phylum: Chordata
- Class: Mammalia
- Order: Chiroptera
- Family: Hipposideridae
- Genus: Hipposideros
- Species: H. rotalis

Binomial name
- Hipposideros rotalis Francis, Kock & Habersetzer, 1999

Species of bat

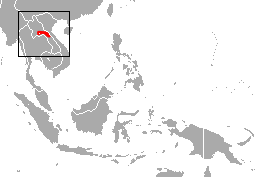
Hipposideros rotalis area

Hipposideros rotalis, the Laotian leaf-nosed bat or Laotian roundleaf bat, is a species of bat from the family Rhinolophidae which is thought to be endemic to Laos . Only a small number of individuals have been recorded, however the population size is thought to be large as it has been found to cover a range of more than 20,000 km^{2}.

== Appearance ==
It has brown upper-parts and paler underparts. Its fur is white at the base and brown in the middle with pale tips. It has a broad nose-leaf that covers its muzzle, and a large internarial disc.

== Habitat ==
It has been observed near limestone cave in forests of central Laos. Individuals have mostly been captured in dry forests. It is unknown if the species needs caves to roost. It is also possible that the species may exist in Vietnam.

== Conservation ==
There is no data on population size, but it is unlikely to be smaller than 10,000. The species is assessed as least concern due to its large extent of occurrence and the fact that its population is unlikely to be declining at the rate required to be listed as a threatened species.

Possible threats to the species include habitat loss and decrease in forest cover due to agriculture. Some of the records of this species are from protected areas.
