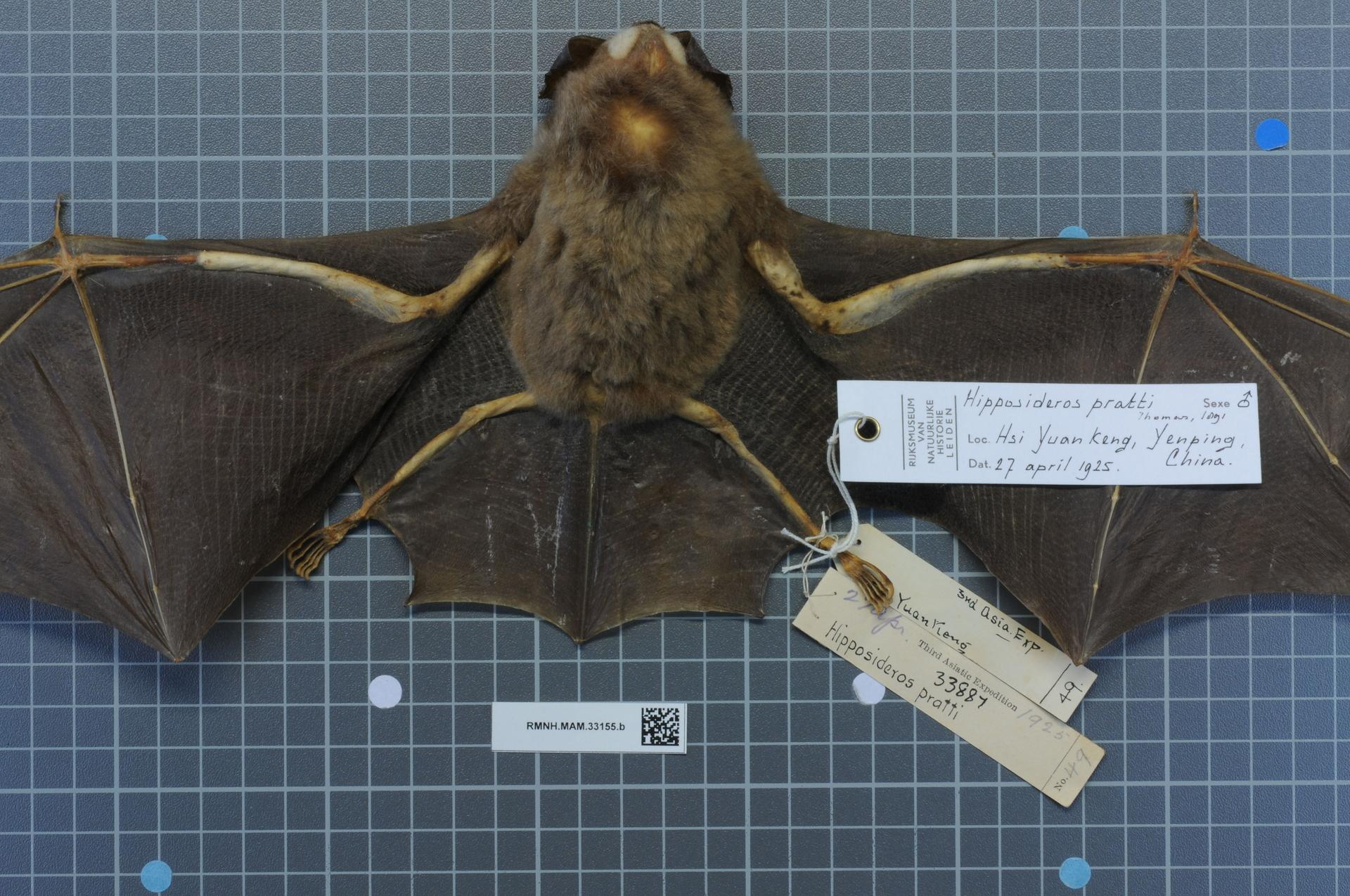

Conservation status
- Least Concern (IUCN 3.1)

Scientific classification
- Kingdom: Animalia
- Phylum: Chordata
- Class: Mammalia
- Order: Chiroptera
- Family: Hipposideridae
- Genus: Hipposideros
- Species: H. swinhoii

Binomial name
- Hipposideros swinhoii Peters, 1871
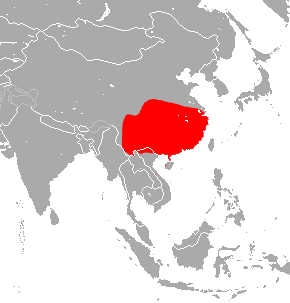
- Pratt's roundleaf bat range

Synonyms
- Hipposideros pratti Thomas, 1891

= Swinhoe's roundleaf bat =

Species of bat

Swinhoe's roundleaf bat or Pratt's roundleaf bat (Hipposideros swinhoii) is a species of bat in the family Hipposideridae. It is found in China, Malaysia, Myanmar, Thailand, and Vietnam.

== Taxonomy and etymology ==
It was described as a new species in 1891 by British zoologist Oldfield Thomas. The eponym for the species name "pratti" is Antwerp Edgar Pratt. Pratt collected the holotype that Thomas used to describe the species. In 2014, an investigation into the type series of Phyllorhina swinhoii, which had previously been thought to be a synonym of Hipposideros armiger, the specimens in the type series belonged to multiple species and the holotype was conspecific with Hipposideros pratti. Therefore, it was concluded that, based on the principle of priority in nomenclature, the scientific name of this species should be replaced with Hipposideros swinhoii.

== Description ==
Swinhoe's roundleaf bat has dorsal fur that is reddish brown in color. However, its ventral fur is lighter. The average forearm length of these bats is 83.4–90.8 mm (3.28–3.57 in) and the average body mass is 53–68.9 g (1.87–2.43 oz). It has a transverse bilobed shield behind the posterior noseleaf. In young males and females the shield may be small, but in old males it becomes an elaborate, flashy structure.

== Range and habitat ==
Swinhoe's roundleaf bat resides in caves which are typical diurnal roosts site and may contain hundreds or thousands of bats. It also shares its roosts with other bat species such as the great roundleaf bat, Hipposideros armiger.
