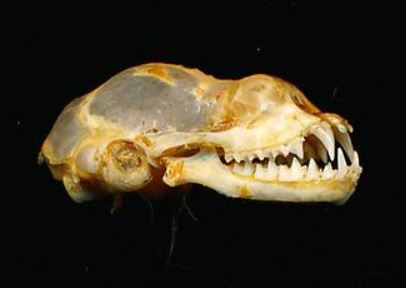

Conservation status
- Data Deficient (IUCN 3.1)

Scientific classification
- Kingdom: Animalia
- Phylum: Chordata
- Class: Mammalia
- Order: Chiroptera
- Family: Hipposideridae
- Genus: Hipposideros
- Species: H. macrobullatus

Binomial name
- Hipposideros macrobullatus Tate, 1941
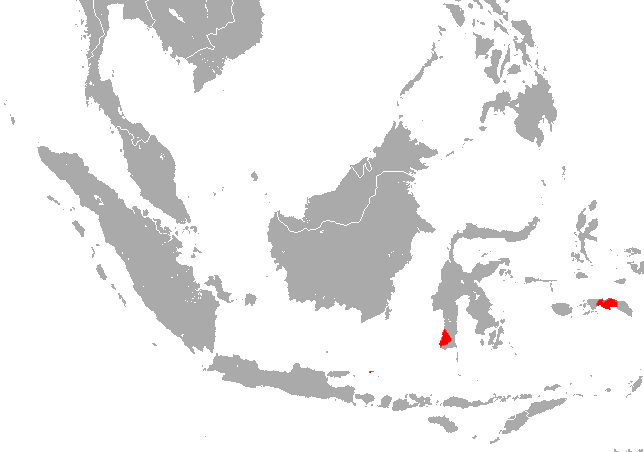
- Big-eared Roundleaf Bat range

= Big-eared roundleaf bat =

Species of bat

The big-eared roundleaf bat (Hipposideros macrobullatus) is a species of bat in the family Hipposideridae. It is endemic to Indonesia, known from Kangean Islands, southwestern Sulawesi and Seram Island. It roosts in caves and tree hollows and probably forages in woodland. It is threatened by habitat loss through logging and other human activities.

== Taxonomy and etymology ==
It was described in 1941 by American zoologist George Henry Hamilton Tate. Tate described it as a new subspecies of the bicolored roundleaf bat, with a trinomen of Hipposideros bicolor macrobullatus. The holotype had been collected by G. Heinrich in 1931 in Maros, Indonesia. Tate wrote that its skull was "noteworthy on the account of the large bullae," likely inspiring the specific epithet "macrobullatus" from Ancient Greek makrós meaning "large" and Latin bulla. In 1986, it was revised to full species status.

== Description ==
Its forearm length is 40.2–42 mm (1.58–1.65 in). Its fur is brown or reddish brown.

== Range and habitat ==
It is endemic to Indonesia. Within Indonesia, it is known from the Kangean Islands, Seram Island, and southwestern Sulawesi.

== Conservation ==
As of 2016, it is evaluated as a data deficient species by the IUCN. Habitat destruction is a likely threat.
