= Maggie Taylor's roundleaf bat =

Conservation status
- Least Concern (IUCN 3.1)

Scientific classification
- Kingdom: Animalia
- Phylum: Chordata
- Class: Mammalia
- Order: Chiroptera
- Family: Hipposideridae
- Genus: Macronycteris
- Species: H. maggietaylorae

Binomial name
- Hipposideros maggietaylorae Smith & Hill, 1981
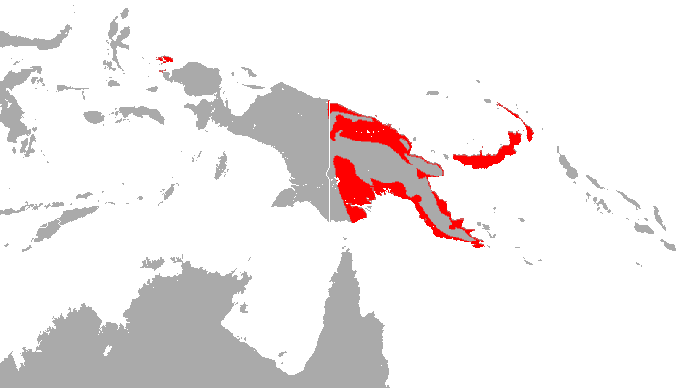
- Maggie Taylor's roundleaf bat range

Species of bat

The Maggie Taylor's roundleaf bat (Hipposideros maggietaylorae) is a species of bat in the family Hipposideridae. It is found in West Papua (Indonesia) and Papua New Guinea.

== Taxonomy and etymology ==
It was described as a new species in 1981 by James Dale Smith and J. Edwards Hill. The holotype had been collected in 1979 in Lengmebung Cave on New Ireland Island. The eponym for the species name "maggietaylorae" is Margaret (Maggie) Taylor. Taylor had financed Smith's research expedition to the Bismarck Archipelago in 1979.

== Description ==
It has a forearm length of 50.4–67.2 mm (1.98–2.65 in). It has dense, woolly fur that is shorter on the head and neck than the rest of the body. Its back fur is grayish brown, while its belly fur is grayish white. It has a dental formula of 1.1.2.32.1.2.3 for a total of 30 teeth.

== Range and habitat ==
It is found on the island of New Guinea (both the Indonesian and the Papua New Guinean sides) as well as several islands of the Bismarck Archipelago of Papua New Guinea. It has been documented at elevations up to 380 ft (120 m) above sea level.

== Conservation ==
As of 2021, it is evaluated as a least-concern species by the IUCN. No major threats to this species have been identified.
