= Spurred roundleaf bat =

Conservation status
- Least Concern (IUCN 3.1)

Scientific classification
- Kingdom: Animalia
- Phylum: Chordata
- Class: Mammalia
- Order: Chiroptera
- Family: Hipposideridae
- Genus: Macronycteris
- Species: H. calcaratus

Binomial name
- Hipposideros calcaratus (Dobson, 1877)
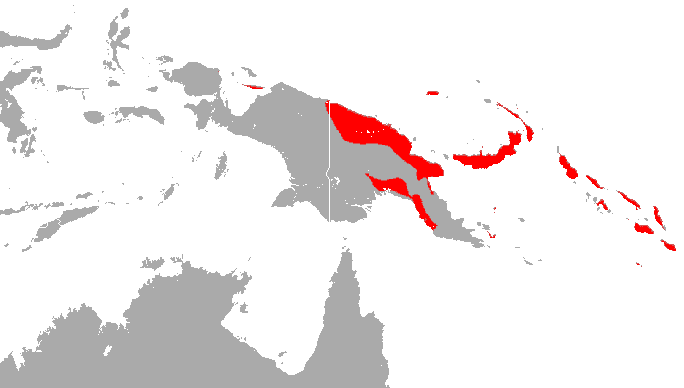
- Spurred roundleaf bat range

Species of bat

The spurred roundleaf bat (Hipposideros calcaratus) is a species of bat in the family Hipposideridae. It is found in Papua New Guinea and the Solomon Islands.
