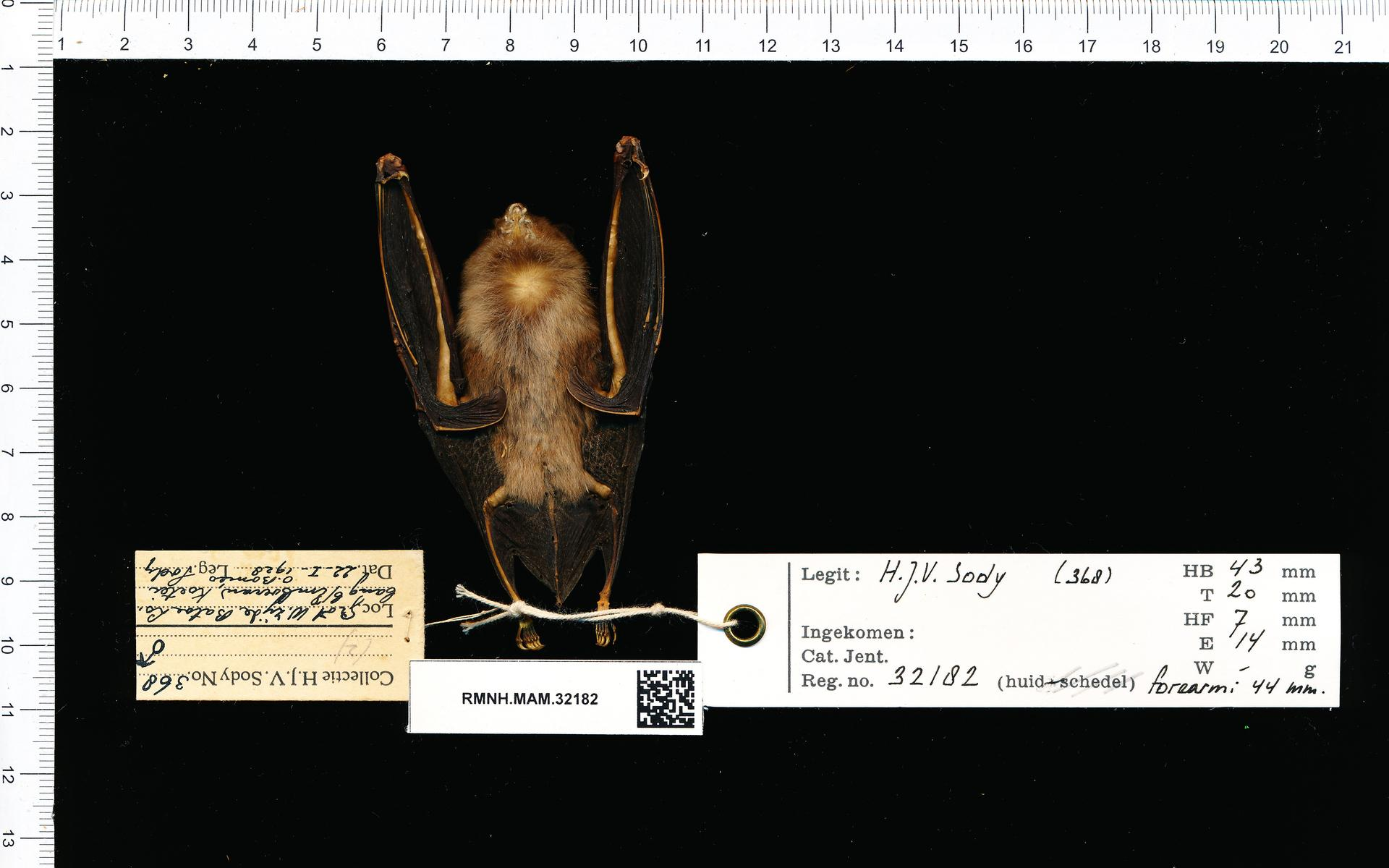

Conservation status
- Least Concern (IUCN 3.1)

Scientific classification
- Kingdom: Animalia
- Phylum: Chordata
- Class: Mammalia
- Order: Chiroptera
- Family: Hipposideridae
- Genus: Hipposideros
- Species: H. dyacorum

Binomial name
- Hipposideros dyacorum Thomas, 1902
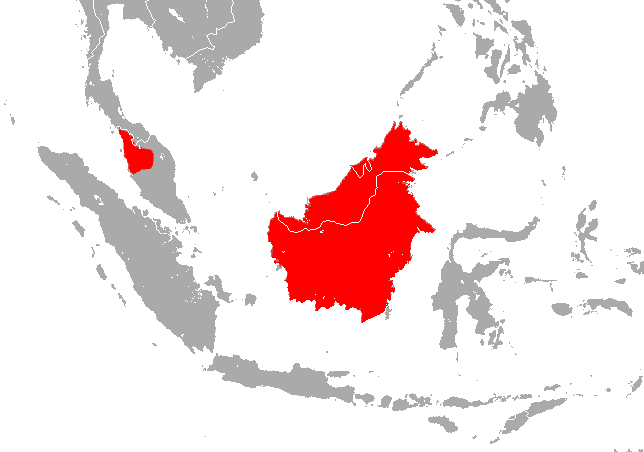
- Dayak roundleaf bat range

Synonyms
- Hipposiderus dyacorum Thomas, 1902

= Dayak roundleaf bat =

Species of bat

The Dayak roundleaf bat (Hipposideros dyacorum), also known as the least roundleaf bat, is a species of bat in the family Hipposideridae. It is endemic to Indonesia and Malaysia.

== Taxonomy ==
The Dayak roundleaf bat was described as a new species in 1902 by British zoologist Oldfield Thomas. Thomas named it Hipposiderus dyacorum, misspelling the genus Hipposideros. The holotype had been collected by Charles Hose on Mount Mulu, Malaysia.

== Description ==
Its forearm length is 40–42 mm (1.6–1.7 in), and individuals weigh 6–10 g (0.21–0.35 oz).
