= Shield-faced roundleaf bat =

Conservation status
- Least Concern (IUCN 3.1)

Scientific classification
- Kingdom: Animalia
- Phylum: Chordata
- Class: Mammalia
- Order: Chiroptera
- Family: Hipposideridae
- Genus: Macronycteris
- Species: H. lylei

Binomial name
- Hipposideros lylei Thomas, 1913
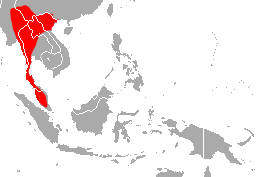
- Shield-faced roundleaf bat range

Species of bat

The shield-faced roundleaf bat (Hipposideros lylei) is a species of bat in the family Hipposideridae. It is found in China, Laos, Malaysia, Myanmar, Thailand and Vietnam.
