= Philippine pygmy roundleaf bat =

Conservation status
- Least Concern (IUCN 3.1)

Scientific classification
- Kingdom: Animalia
- Phylum: Chordata
- Class: Mammalia
- Order: Chiroptera
- Family: Hipposideridae
- Genus: Macronycteris
- Species: H. pygmaeus

Binomial name
- Hipposideros pygmaeus (Waterhouse, 1843)
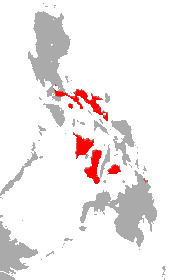
- Philippine pygmy roundleaf bat range

Synonyms
- Rhinolophus pygmaeus Waterhouse, 1843

Species of bat

The Philippine pygmy roundleaf bat (Hipposideros pygmaeus), also called the Philippine pygmy leaf-nosed bat, is a species of bat in the family Hipposideridae. It is endemic to the Philippines, where it has been recorded on Bohol, Luzon (Camarines Sur and Rizal provinces), Marinduque, Negros, Panay, and Mindanao (in Surigao del Sur).

== Taxonomy and etymology ==
It was described as a new species in 1843 by English naturalist George Robert Waterhouse. Waterhouse placed it in the genus Rhinolophus with a scientific name of Rhinolophus pygmaeus. The holotype had been collected by Hugh Cuming. The species name "pygmaeus" is Latin for "small." Waterhouse described it as "a small species."

== Distribution and conservation ==
The Philippine pygmy roundleaf bat is found in several islands along the Philippines. It is found mostly in caves and non-aquatic subterranean locations, along with general forests. Specimens have been found in limestone caves and near or in lowland forests. Though forestation and mining is harmful, it is now thought that the bats are more tolerant to disturbance than once believed. Locally in the area, it is also hunted and trapped for food, though those actions do not heavily harm the species.
