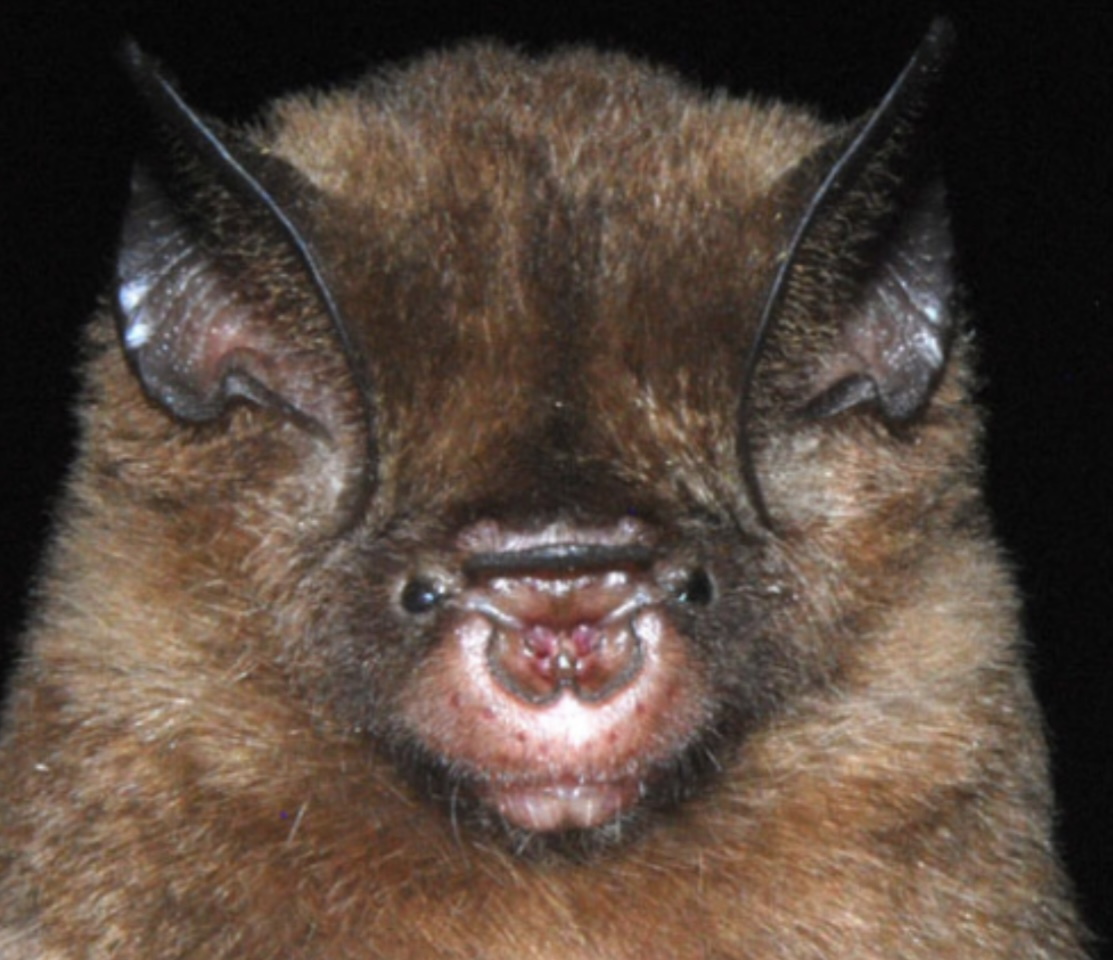

Conservation status
- Near Threatened (IUCN 3.1)

Scientific classification
- Kingdom: Animalia
- Phylum: Chordata
- Class: Mammalia
- Order: Chiroptera
- Family: Hipposideridae
- Genus: Hipposideros
- Species: H. doriae

Binomial name
- Hipposideros doriae (Peters, 1871)
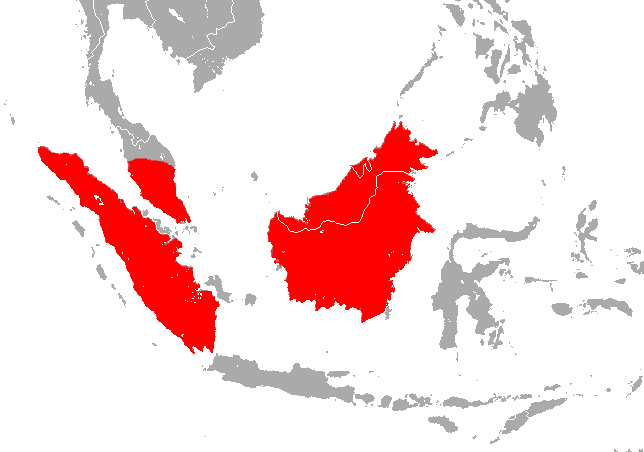
- Borneo roundleaf bat range

Synonyms
- Rhinolophus doriae Peters, 1871; Hipposideros sabanus Thomas, 1898

= Borneo roundleaf bat =

Species of bat

The Borneo roundleaf bat or Bornean leaf-nosed bat (Hipposideros doriae) is a species of bat in the family Hipposideridae. It is found in Borneo, Sumatra and Peninsular Malaysia. Hipposideros sabanus is a synonym of this species.

== Taxonomy ==
The Borneo roundleaf bat was described as a new species in 1871 by German naturalist Wilhelm Peters. Peters placed it in the now-defunct genus Phyllorhina, with a scientific name of Phyllorhina doriae. Hipposideros sabanus is used as a synonym of this species.

== Description ==
The species is small and has dark fur. The bat lacks lateral leaflets, with the posterior nose leaf lacking a supporting septa. It has a forearm length of 34–37 mm (1.3–1.5 in).

== Habitat and distribution ==
The bat is found in Malaysia, Borneo, and Sumatra. It inhabits only primary forest and is not known to inhabit disturbed areas.

== Conservation ==
The bat is listed as near-threatened. The main threats to the bat are that habitat loss due to deforestation, agriculture, plantations and fires. However, the bat is known to occur in some protected areas spread across its range.
