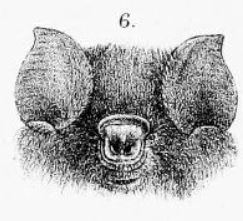

Conservation status
- Least Concern (IUCN 3.1)

Scientific classification
- Kingdom: Animalia
- Phylum: Chordata
- Class: Mammalia
- Order: Chiroptera
- Family: Hipposideridae
- Genus: Macronycteris
- Species: H. fuliginosus

Binomial name
- Hipposideros fuliginosus (Temminck, 1853)
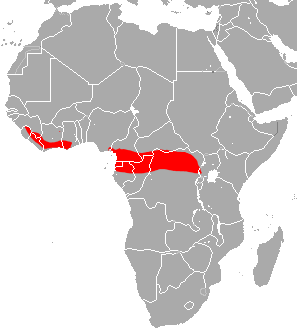
- Sooty roundleaf bat range

= Sooty roundleaf bat =

Species of bat

The sooty roundleaf bat (Hipposideros fuliginosus) is a species of bat in the family Hipposideridae. It is found in Cameroon, Democratic Republic of the Congo, Ivory Coast, Gabon, Ghana, Guinea, Liberia, Nigeria, Sierra Leone, and Uganda. Its natural habitats are subtropical or tropical moist lowland forests and moist savanna.
