= Short-headed roundleaf bat =

Conservation status
- Data Deficient (IUCN 3.1)

Scientific classification
- Kingdom: Animalia
- Phylum: Chordata
- Class: Mammalia
- Order: Chiroptera
- Family: Hipposideridae
- Genus: Hipposideros
- Species: H. breviceps

Binomial name
- Hipposideros breviceps Tate, 1941
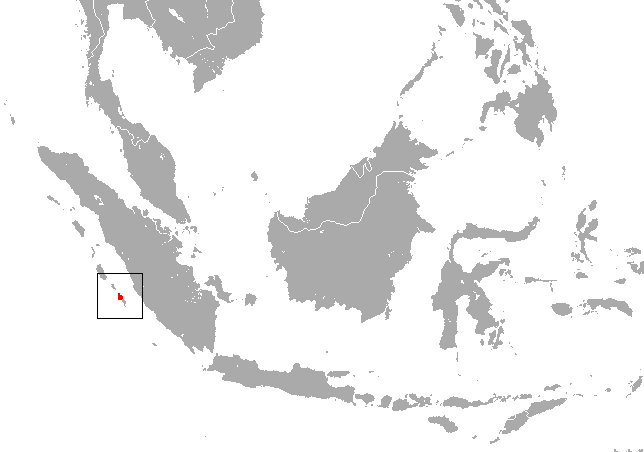
- Short-headed roundleaf bat range

Species of bat

The short-headed roundleaf bat (Hipposideros breviceps) is a species of bat in the family Hipposideridae endemic to Indonesia. It is known only from the type specimen.
