= Large Mindanao roundleaf bat =

Conservation status
- Data Deficient (IUCN 3.1)

Scientific classification
- Kingdom: Animalia
- Phylum: Chordata
- Class: Mammalia
- Order: Chiroptera
- Family: Hipposideridae
- Genus: Macronycteris
- Species: H. coronatus

Binomial name
- Hipposideros coronatus Peters, 1871
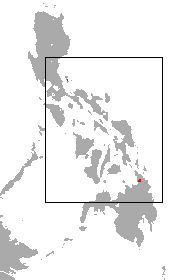
- Large Mindanao roundleaf bat range

Species of bat

The large Mindanao roundleaf bat (Hipposideros coronatus) is a species of bat in the family Hipposideridae endemic to the Philippines.
