= Thailand roundleaf bat =

Conservation status
- Vulnerable (IUCN 3.1)

Scientific classification
- Kingdom: Animalia
- Phylum: Chordata
- Class: Mammalia
- Order: Chiroptera
- Family: Hipposideridae
- Genus: Macronycteris
- Species: H. halophyllus

Binomial name
- Hipposideros halophyllus Hill & Yenbutra, 1984
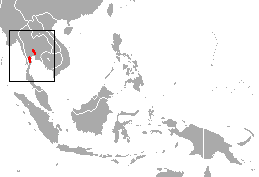
- Thailand roundleaf bat range

Species of bat

The Thailand roundleaf bat (Hipposideros halophyllus) is a species of bat in the family Hipposideridae. It is endemic to Thailand.

== Distribution ==
Hipposideros halophyllus is found in:

- Khao Samor Khon, Lopburi Province (1,000-1,400 individuals)
- Pha Daeng Cave, Chiang Mai Province (fewer than 200 individuals)
- Khao Singto, Sa Kaeo Province (fewer than 200 individuals)
- Ton Chan Cave, Saraburi Province
- Khao Yoi Cave, Phetchaburi Province
