= Hipposideros tephrus =

Conservation status
- Least Concern (IUCN 3.1)

Scientific classification
- Kingdom: Animalia
- Phylum: Chordata
- Class: Mammalia
- Order: Chiroptera
- Family: Hipposideridae
- Genus: Macronycteris
- Species: H. tephrus

Binomial name
- Hipposideros tephrus Cabrera, 1906

Species of bat

Hipposideros tephrus is a species of bat in the family Hipposideridae. It is found in forest and savanna in Morocco, Yemen, and Senegal. It is assessed by the IUCN as least-concern.
