= Fierce roundleaf bat =

Conservation status
- Vulnerable (IUCN 3.1)

Scientific classification
- Kingdom: Animalia
- Phylum: Chordata
- Class: Mammalia
- Order: Chiroptera
- Family: Hipposideridae
- Genus: Hipposideros
- Species: H. dinops

Binomial name
- Hipposideros dinops K. Andersen, 1905
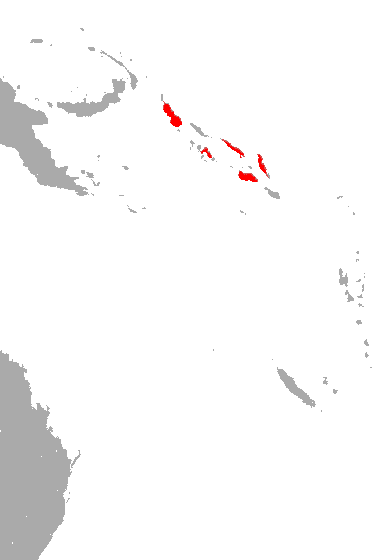
- Fierce roundleaf bat range

Species of bat

The fierce roundleaf bat (Hipposideros dinops) is a species of bat in the family Hipposideridae. It is found in Indonesia, Papua New Guinea, and the Solomon Islands.
