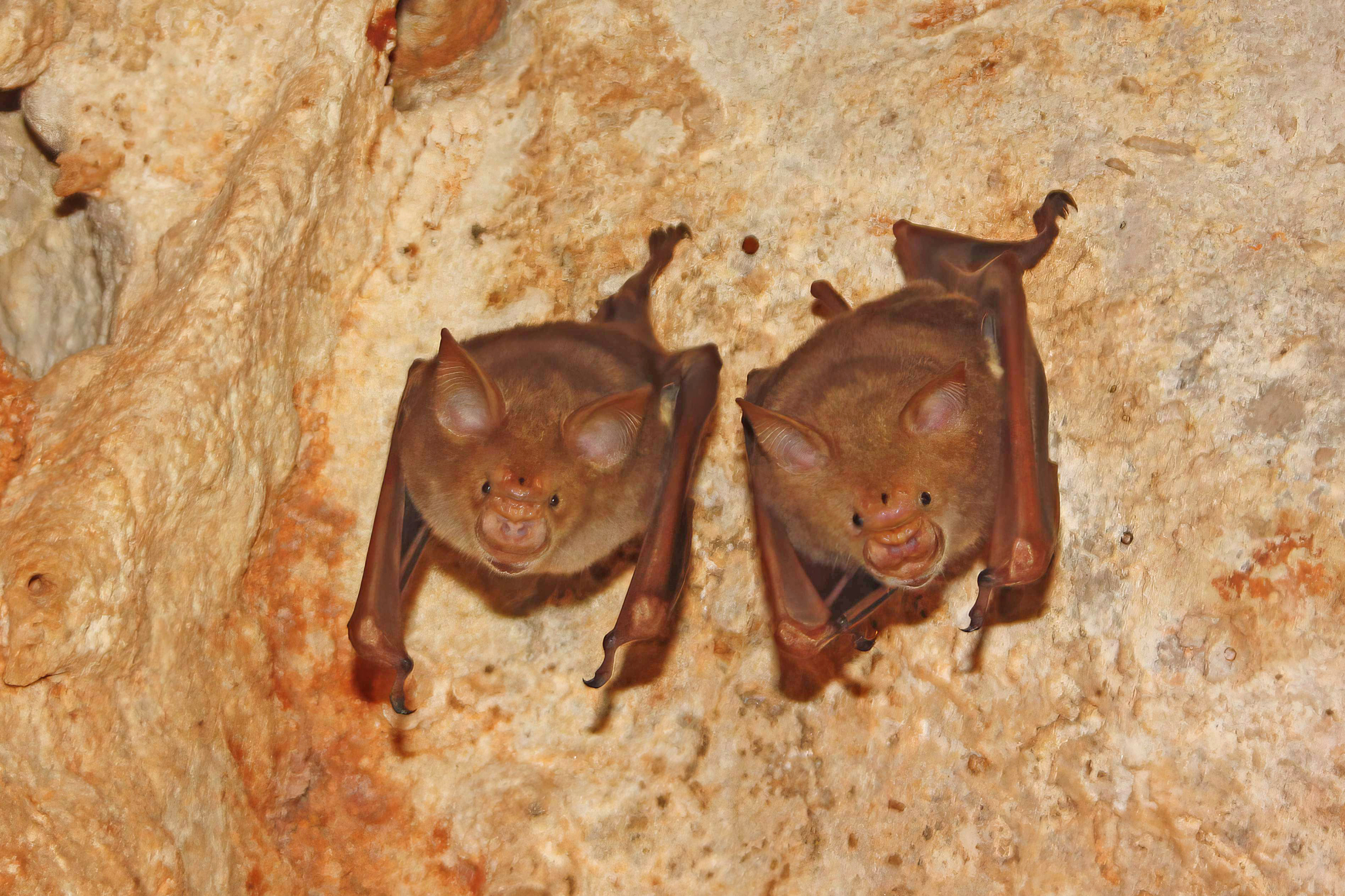
- Commerson's leaf-nosed bat (Hipposideros commersoni)

Scientific classification
- Kingdom: Animalia
- Phylum: Chordata
- Class: Mammalia
- Order: Chiroptera
- Superfamily: Rhinolophoidea
- Family: Hipposideridae; Lydekker, 1891

Type genus
- Hipposideros Gray, 1831

Genera
- See text
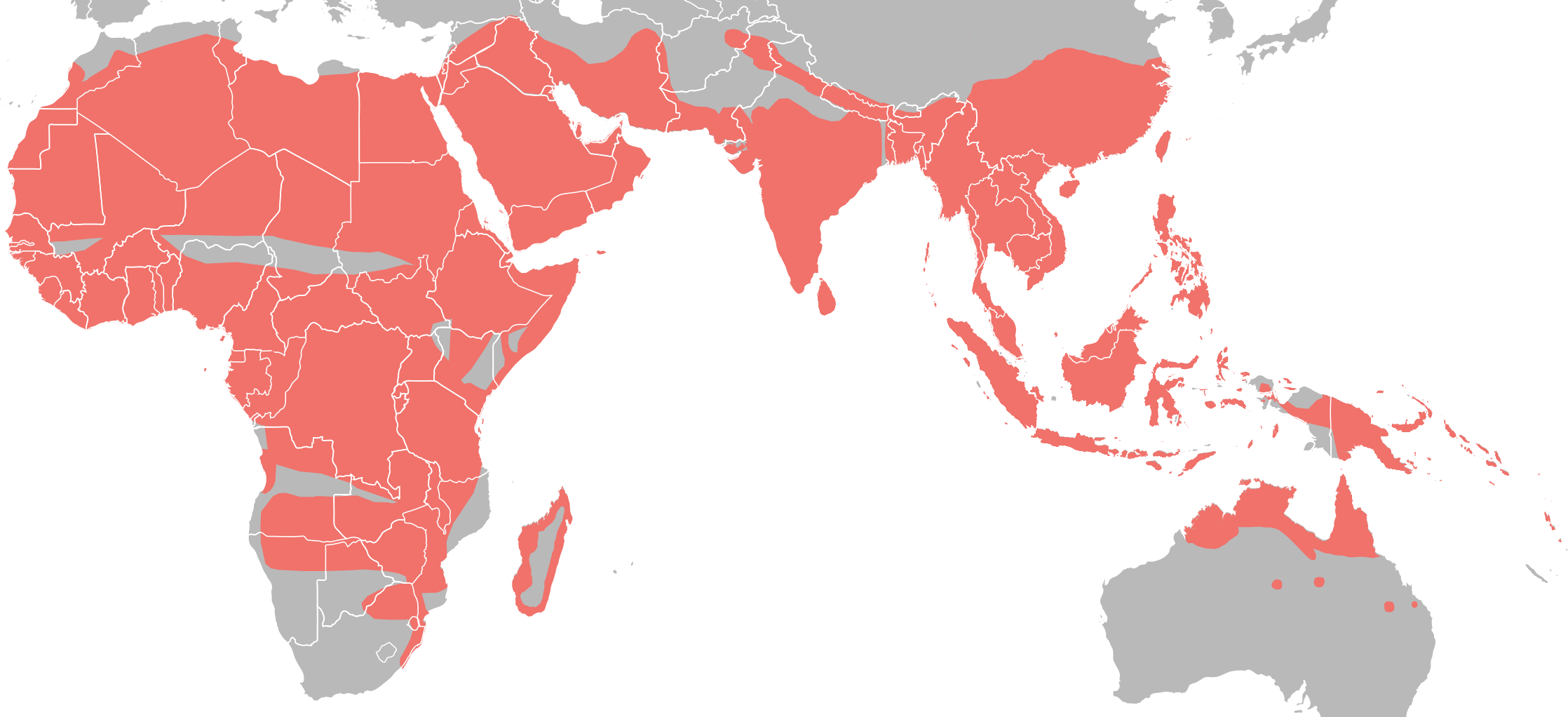
- Hipposideridae distribution

Synonyms
- Rhinonycterina J.E. Gray, 1866 (Note: This name technically has priority over Hipposiderinae Lydekker, 1891, and some have consequently used "Rhinonycteridae" or "Rhinonycterinae" for this (sub)family; however, Hipposideridae/inae has been in common use since 1907 and is currently retained pending action by the International Commission on Zoological Nomenclature.)

= Hipposideridae =

Hipposideridae Temporal range: Eocene to present

Family of bats

The Hipposideridae are a family of bats commonly known as the Old World leaf-nosed bats. While it has often been seen as a subfamily, Hipposiderinae, of the family Rhinolophidae, it is now more generally classified as its own family. Nevertheless, it is most closely related to Rhinolophidae within the suborder Yinpterochiroptera.

== Taxonomy ==
The Hipposideridae contain 10 living genera and more than 70 species, mostly in the widespread genus Hipposideros. In addition, several fossil genera are known; the oldest fossils attributed to the family are from the middle Eocene of Europe. In their 1997 Classification of Mammals, Malcolm C. McKenna and Susan K. Bell proposed a division of Hipposideridae (called Rhinonycterinae in their work) into three tribes, one with two subtribes, but these tribes turned out to be non-monophyletic and have been abandoned. A different classification was proposed by Hand and Kirsch in 2003. In 2009, Petr Benda and Peter Vallo proposed a separate tribe, Triaenopini, for the genera Triaenops, Paratriaenops, and possibly Cloeotis, synonymised in a 2014 revision (Foley, et al.) that elevated the family Rhinonycteridae. The Hipposideridae have many different families, previously confused to be the same for their similar appearance. The Hipposideridae fulvus is very similar to the Hipposideridae Pomona, which were a part of the same family in the past. The macrobullatus, considered to be a subspecies of the Hipposideridae are also part of a different family. Among the Hipposideridae species, there is an increased amount of mitochondrial differentation, possibly leading to these subspecies being intermixed and confused as one.

== Genera ==
The genera included in Hipposideridae are:

=== Living ===
- Anthops (one species; Solomon Islands and Bougainville Island)
- Asellia (four species; Africa and southwestern Asia; Miocene fossils from Europe)
- Aselliscus (three species; southeastern Asia and Melanesia)
- Coelops (at least two species; southeastern Asia; Miocene fossils from Africa)
- Doryrhina (two species, Africa)
- Hipposideros (more than sixty species; Africa, southern Eurasia, and Australasia; oldest fossils from the Eocene of Europe; includes Pseudorhinolophus, sometimes considered a separate genus)
- Macronycteris (five species, Africa and Madagascar)

(Note that genus Paracoelops was previously listed for Vietnam is now a synonym of Hipposideros pomona)

=== Extinct ===
- Archerops (Miocene of Australia)
- Miophyllorhina (Miocene of Australia)
- Palaeophyllophora (Eocene to Miocene of Europe)
- Paraphyllophora (Eocene or Oligocene to Miocene of Europe)
- Riversleigha (Miocene of Australia)
- Vaylatsia (Oligocene of Europe)
- Xenorhinos (Miocene of Australia)

== List of species ==
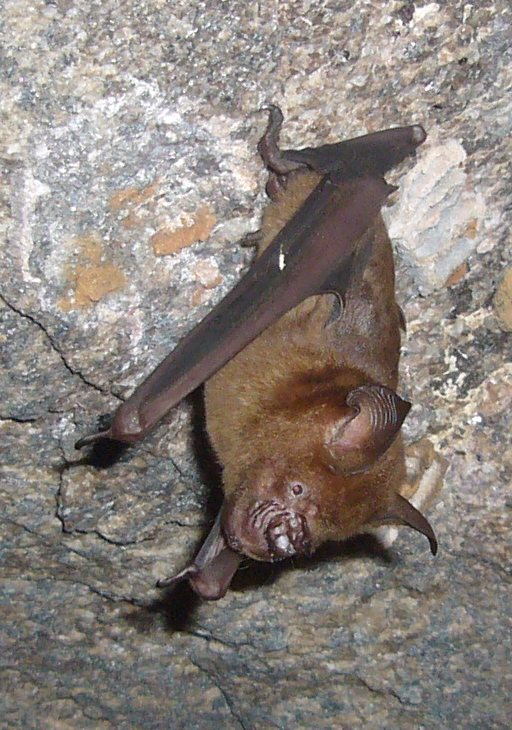
Hipposideros lankadiva in Sri Lanka

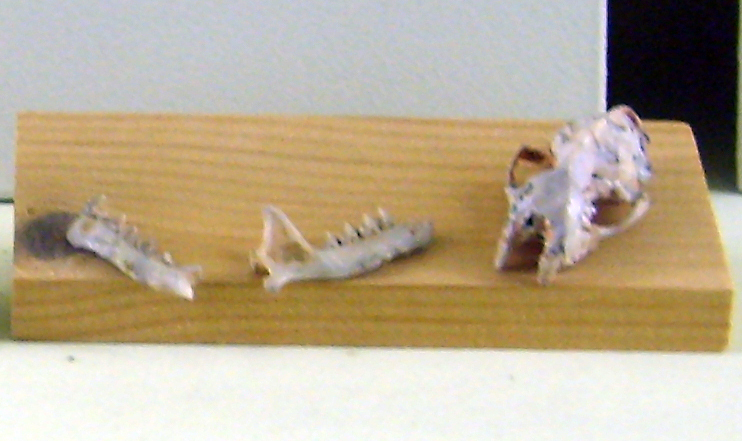
Pseudorhinolophus antiquus skull and lower jaw at the Museum für Naturkunde, Berlin

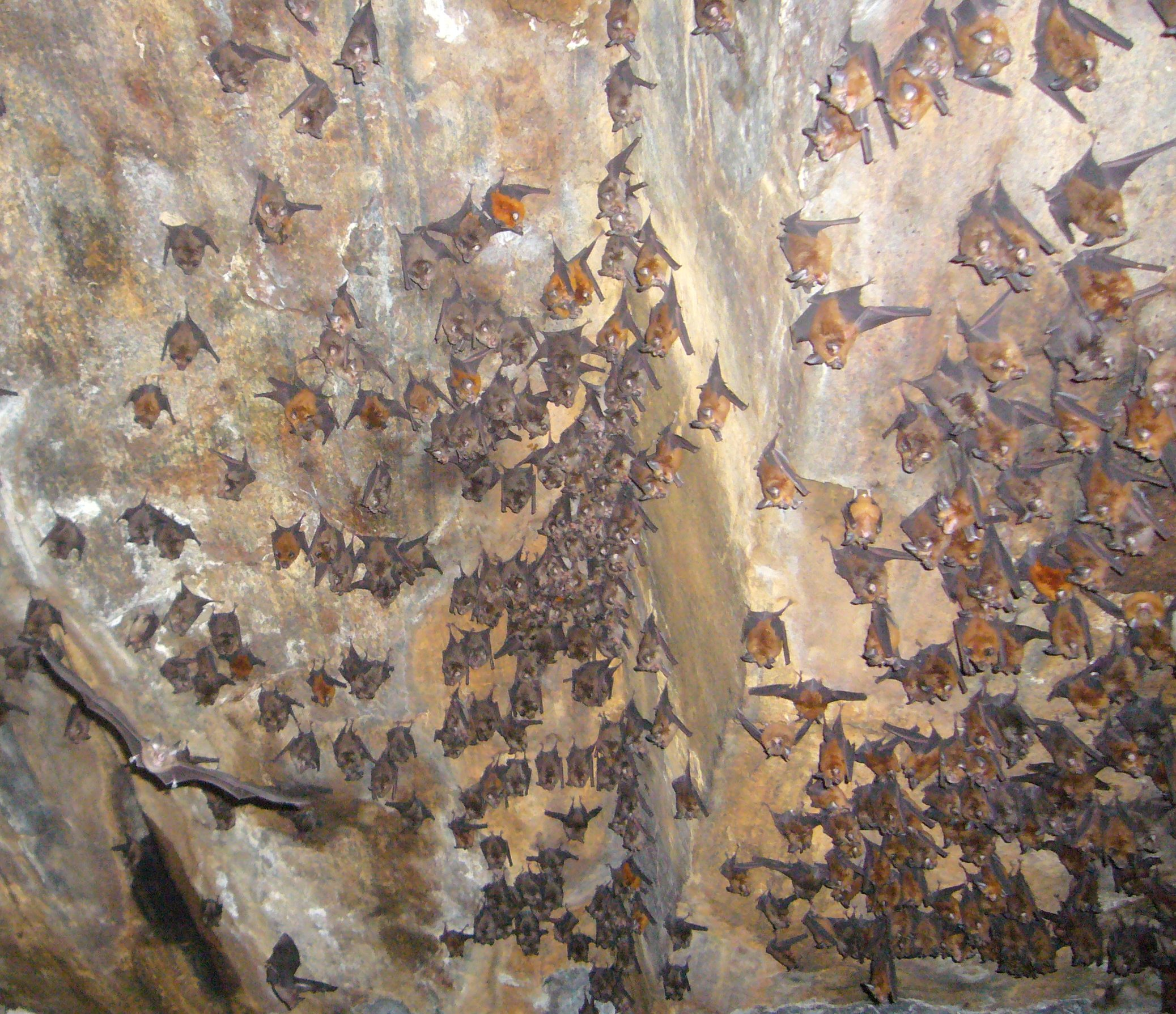
Colony of Hipposideros lankadiva (or perhaps Hipposideros speori) in a cave in Sri Lanka

- Family Hipposideridae — Old World leaf-nosed bats
  - Genus Anthops
    - Flower-faced bat, Anthops ornatus
  - Genus Asellia — trident leaf-nosed bats
    - Arabian trident bat, Asellia arabica
    - Somalian trident bat, Asellia italosomalica
    - Patrizi's trident leaf-nosed bat, Asellia patrizii
    - Trident bat, Asellia tridens
  - Genus Aselliscus — Tate's trident-nosed bats
    - Stoliczka's trident bat, Aselliscus stoliczkanus
    - Temminck's trident bat, Aselliscus tricuspidatus
    - Dong Bac's trident bat, Aselliscus dongbacana
  - Genus Coelops — tailless leaf-nosed bats
    - East Asian tailless leaf-nosed bat, Coelops frithii
    - Malayan tailless leaf-nosed bat, Coelops robinsoni
  - Genus Doryrhina — roundleaf bats
    - Greater roundleaf bat, Doryrhina camerunensis
    - Cyclops roundleaf bat, Doryrhina cyclops
  - Genus Hipposideros — roundleaf bats
    - Aba roundleaf bat, Hipposideros abae
    - Ha Long leaf-nosed bat, Hipposideros alongensis
    - Great roundleaf bat, Hipposideros armiger
    - Dusky roundleaf bat, Hipposideros ater
    - Benito roundleaf bat, Hipposideros beatus
    - Bicolored roundleaf bat, Hipposideros bicolor
    - Boeadi's roundleaf bat, Hipposideros boeadii
    - Short-headed roundleaf bat, Hipposideros breviceps
    - Sundevall's roundleaf bat, Hipposideros caffer
    - Spurred roundleaf bat, Hipposideros calcaratus
    - Fawn leaf-nosed bat or fawn roundleaf bat, Hipposideros cervinus
    - Ashy roundleaf bat, Hipposideros cineraceus
    - Large Mindanao roundleaf bat, Hipposideros coronatus
    - Telefomin roundleaf bat, Hipposideros corynophyllus
    - Cox's roundleaf bat, Hipposideros coxi
    - Timor roundleaf bat, Hipposideros crumeniferus
    - Short-tailed roundleaf bat, Hipposideros curtus
    - Makira roundleaf bat, Hipposideros demissus
    - Diadem roundleaf bat, Hipposideros diadema
    - Fierce roundleaf bat, Hipposideros dinops
    - Borneo roundleaf bat, Hipposideros doriae
    - Khajuria's leaf-nosed bat, Hipposideros durgadasi
    - Dayak roundleaf bat, Hipposideros dyacorum
    - Hill's roundleaf bat, Hipposideros edwardshilli
    - House-dwelling leaf-nosed bat, Hipposideros einnaythu
    - Hipposideros fasensis
    - Sooty roundleaf bat, Hipposideros fuliginosus
    - Fulvus roundleaf bat, Hipposideros fulvus
    - Cantor's roundleaf bat, Hipposideros galeritus
    - Andersen's leaf-nosed bat, Hipposideros gentilis
    - Grand roundleaf bat, Hipposideros grandis
    - Griffin's leaf-nosed bat, Hipposideros griffini
    - Thailand roundleaf bat, Hipposideros halophyllus
    - Kolar leaf-nosed bat, Hipposideros hypophyllus
    - Crested roundleaf bat, Hipposideros inexpectatus
    - Arnhem leaf-nosed bat, Hipposideros inornatus
    - Jones's roundleaf bat, Hipposideros jonesi
    - Phou Khao Khouay leaf-nosed bat, Hipposideros khaokhouayensis
    - Khasian leaf-nosed bat, Hipposideros khasiana
    - Kunz's Bicolored Leaf-nosed Bat, Hipposideros kunzi
    - Lamotte's roundleaf bat, Hipposideros lamottei
    - Indian roundleaf bat, Hipposideros lankadiva
    - Intermediate roundleaf bat, Hipposideros larvatus
    - Large Asian roundleaf bat, Hipposideros lekaguli
    - Shield-faced roundleaf bat, Hipposideros lylei
    - Big-eared roundleaf bat, Hipposideros macrobullatus
    - Maduran leaf-nosed bat, Hipposideros madurae
    - Maggie Taylor's roundleaf bat, Hipposideros maggietaylorae
    - Aellen's roundleaf bat, Hipposideros marisae
    - Ethiopian large-eared roundleaf bat, Hipposideros megalotis
    - Fly River roundleaf bat, Hipposideros muscinus
    - Malayan roundleaf bat, Hipposideros nequam
    - Nicobar Leaf-nosed Bat, Hipposideros nicobarulae
    - Philippine forest roundleaf bat, Hipposideros obscurus
    - Orbiculus leaf-nosed bat, Hipposideros orbiculus
    - Biak roundleaf bat, Hipposideros papua
    - Hipposideros parnabyi
    - Peleng leaf-nosed bat, Hipposideros pelingensis
    - Pendlebury's roundleaf bat, Hipposideros pendleburyi
    - Pomona roundleaf bat, Hipposideros pomona
    - Philippine pygmy roundleaf bat, Hipposideros pygmaeus
    - Ridley's leaf-nosed bat, Hipposideros ridleyi
    - Laotian leaf-nosed bat, Hipposideros rotalis
    - Noack's roundleaf bat, Hipposideros ruber
    - Shield-nosed leaf-nosed bat, Hipposideros scutinares
    - Semon's roundleaf bat, Hipposideros semoni
    - Sorensen's leaf-nosed bat, Hipposideros sorenseni
    - Schneider's leaf-nosed bat, Hipposideros speoris
    - Northern leaf-nosed bat or narrow-eared roundleaf bat, Hipposideros stenotis
    - Sumba roundleaf bat or Sumban leaf-nosed bat, Hipposideros sumbae
    - Pratt's roundleaf bat, Hipposideros swinhoei
    - Maghreb leaf-nosed bat, Hipposideros tephrus
    - Lesser great leaf-nosed bat, Hipposideros turpis
    - Wollaston's roundleaf bat, Hipposideros wollastoni
  - Genus Macronycteris
    - Commerson's leaf-nosed bat or Commerson's roundleaf bat, Macronycteris commersoni
    - Macronycteris cryptovalorona
    - Giant roundleaf bat, Macronycteris gigas
    - Saõ Tomé leaf-nosed bat, Macronycteris thomensis
    - Striped leaf-nosed bat, Macronycteris vittatus
