= Nose-leaf =

Nose found in some species of bats

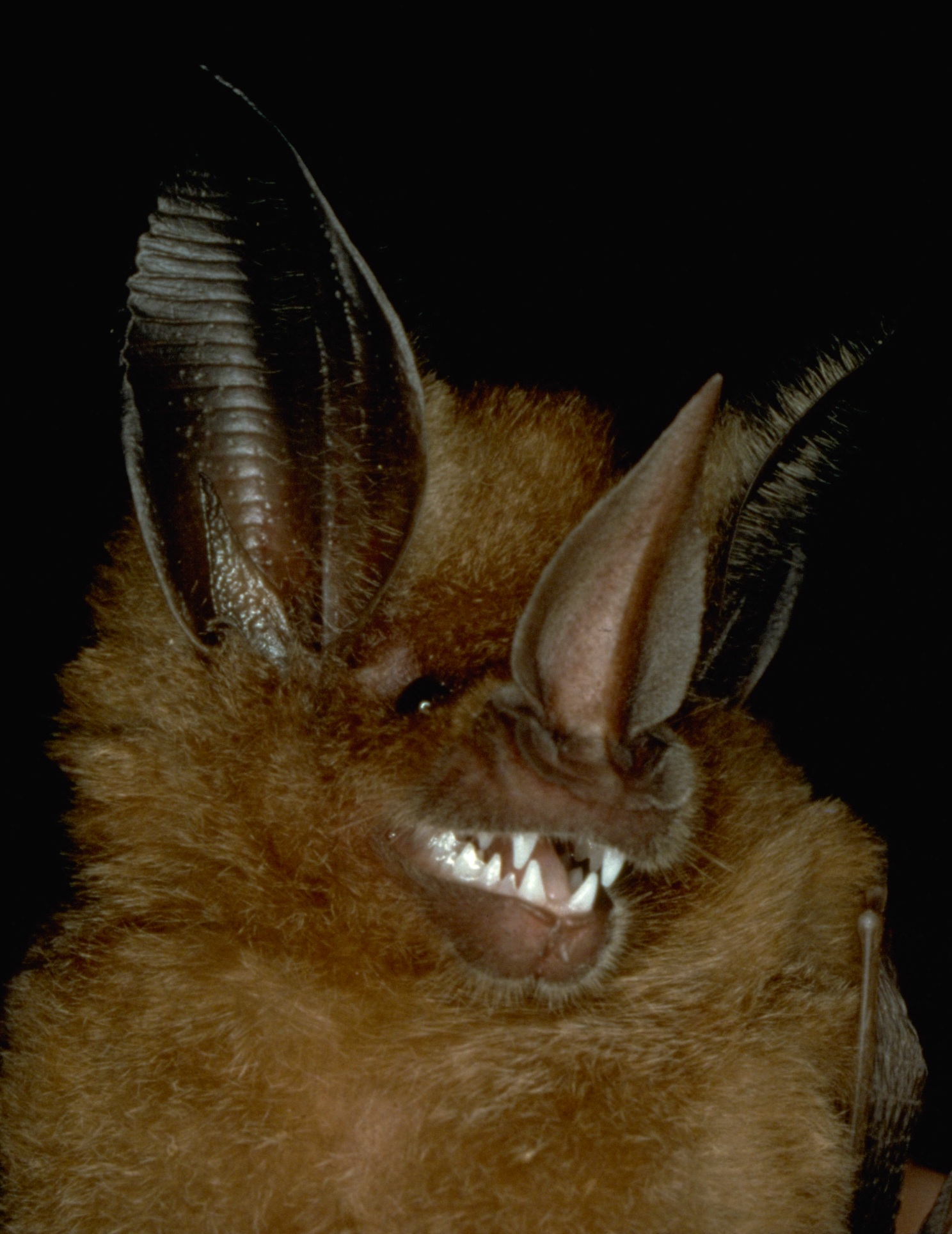
Noseleaf of a phyllostomid bat.

The nose-leaf, or noseleaf, is the fleshy, lanceolate nose of bats of the Phyllostomidae, Hipposideridae, and Rhinolophidae families. Noseleaves aid in the modification and direction of sound during echolocation. Their form is complex and species-specific, showing adaptations to foraging techniques, and prey detection.

The shape of noseleaves is diverse, and differs among bat species based on variations in foraging habits and sensory specializations. Such anatomical specializations can help researchers understand a bat's behavior. Three different lineages of bats have independently evolved a nose-leaf, in an example of convergent evolution.

== Phylogenetic distribution and evolutionary history ==
Noseleaves are found in three families: all members of family Phyllostomidae (also known as the leaf-nosed bats), as well as certain members of Hipposideridae and Rhinolophidae. Most living echolocating bats are nasal emissors. This transition in bat evolution created a selective pressure to direct the sound beam and focus the emission. Noseleaves are an adaptation for nasal echolocation, and serve multiple purposes: to filter for interference before the sound gets to the receptor organ, provide directionality, and enhance prey detection.

The noseleaf has several independent evolutionary origins. Rhinolophidae and Hipposideridae noseleafs tend to have similar patterns, evolved in the Old World. These groups show similar characteristics showing ancestral features, like anterior projections accompaining the noseleaf. While, Phyllostomidae evolved another pattern independently in the New World, having noseleaves resembling the tip of a spear, but also the diveristy of the projections around the noseleaf is greater in this group.

== Evolutionary development ==
Being under strong selective pressure given their ecological niche during the Early Eocene, being nocturnal flyers feeding on nocturnal insects, these mammals needed echolocation to facilitate their mode of hunting their preys in their habitat. One of the main features that permitted the development of the structure was repurposing the facial muscles, specifically the musculus maxillolabialis, ancestraly supporting vibrissae for the support and movement of the noseleaf. While since early embryonic development, this structure seems to be developing, as the groups that present it, have a greater cell proliferation in the facial portion compared to other mammals, specifically to the frontonasal and maxillary regions. Which later in development will create enlarged cartilage and the tissue that forms the cartilage.

On the other hand, an evolutionary trade-off was the restructuring the internal nasal tubinates, as for echolocation to occur the turbinate complexity, associated with olfactory capacity, has been simplified in nasal echolocators, which means that more specialized noseleafed bats tend to have decreased olfaction compared to others.

== Anatomy and functional morphology ==
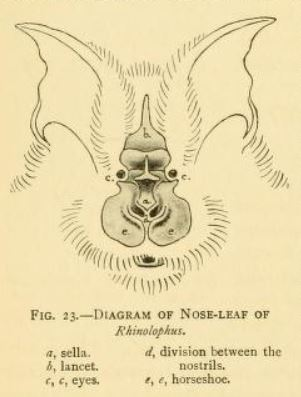
Nose-leaf diagram of a horseshoe bat

The noseleaf helps to modify and direct the sound beam during echolocation. Modeling experiments suggest that these modifications can influence the width, frequency, and direction of the sound beam. These structures work together to enhance the directional echolocation calls of the animal and reflect signals back from the nose to the pinnae (ears). The general structure of a noseleaf is a concave dish with a series of protrusions that amplifies and directs pulses from the nostrils.

In phyllostomid and horseshoe bats, the nose is divided into the three main parts. Above the nostrils, the nose reaches a point known as the spear or lancet. The lancet is responsible for directing pulses along a vertical axis. Horseshoe bats are known to quickly flick their lancet to redirect sound beams. The section protruding most distally from the face is called the sella. The furrow beneath the nostrils is the anterior leaf, or "horseshoe". Hipposterid bats lack the lancet at the tip of the nose. Although these families contain functionally similar structures, their arrangement on the face differs broadly. Variance in the placement of these structures, or the gross morphology of the face, influences a bat's echolcating capabilities.

These structures vary in shape and size across different bat species, and are often used as anatomical landmarks to resolve phylogenetic relationships between species.

Hipposterid and rhinolophid bats emit two distinct pulses at different frequencies during echolocation. Different parts of the noseleaf of horseshoe bats have been shown to amplify distinct frequencies. Hipposterid bats will alter the shape of their noseleaves and pinnae during echolocation.

== Behavioral and ecological significance ==
Morphological variation in nose-leaves has been associated with echolocation strategy, habitat, and foraging behavior among nasal echolocators. For instance, variation in size, shape, and complexity of nose-leaves may influence echolocation calls, thereby affecting prey detection and localization in different ecological contexts.

Among Phyllostomidae, nose-leaf morphological variation has also been associated with foraging behavior and diet. For instance, echolocating Phyllostomidae that forage in cluttered environments or employ passive listening for prey localization often exhibit more complex nose-leaf morphologies, possibly improving echolocation signal directionality or sensitivity to returning echoes.

Comparative studies among bat families indicate that echolocation signal directionality, sensitivity, and ecological constraints are often associated with specialization in nose-leaf shape, suggesting that echolocating bats often exhibit broader ecological niches and hunting strategies. Therefore, nose-leaf morphological variation is considered to be a critical link between sensory biology and ecological specialization among echolocating bats.
