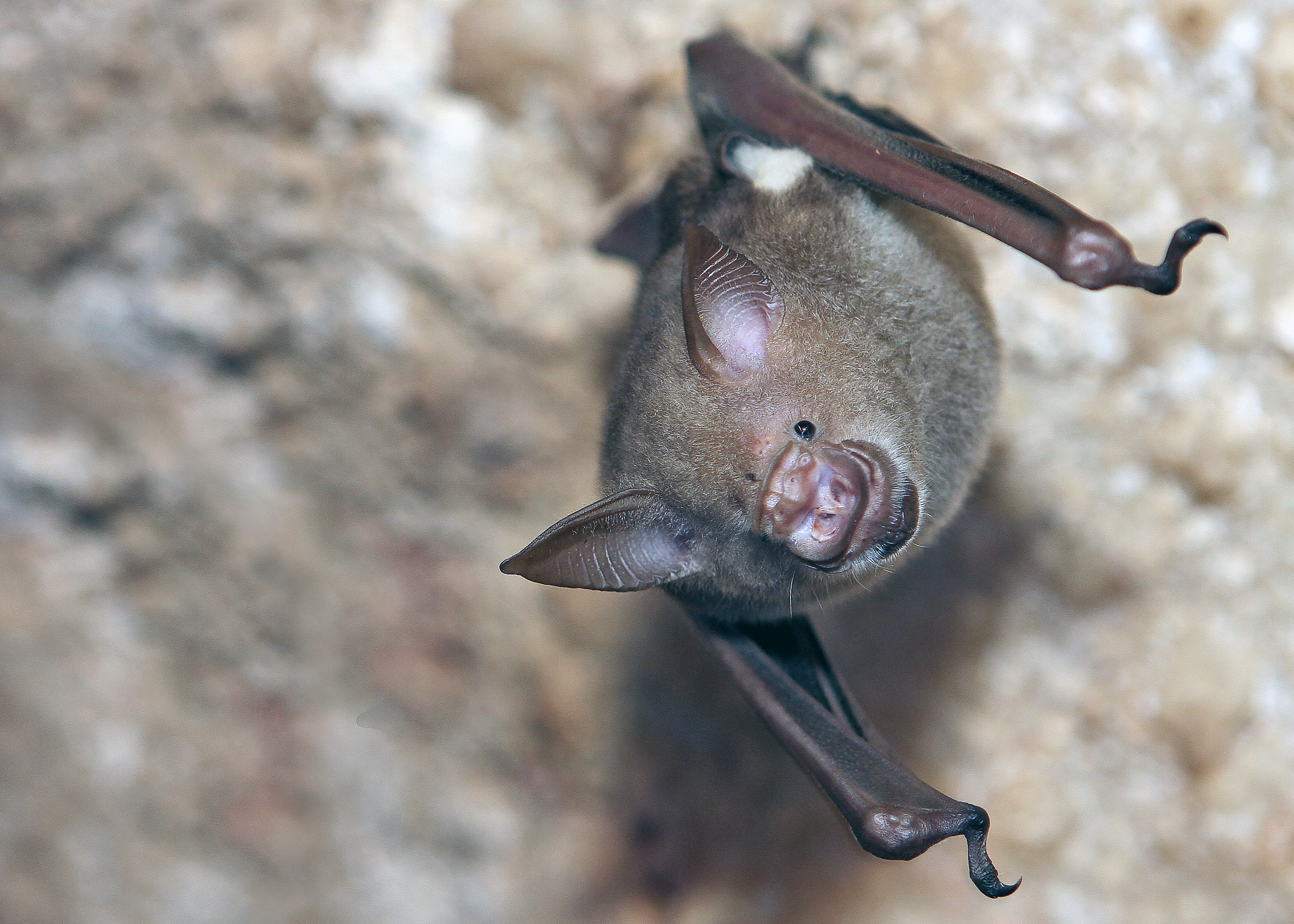

Scientific classification
- Kingdom: Animalia
- Phylum: Chordata
- Class: Mammalia
- Order: Chiroptera
- Family: Hipposideridae
- Genus: Macronycteris; Gray, 1866

= Macronycteris =

Genus of bats

Macronycteris is a genus of bats belonging to the family Hipposideridae.

The species of this genus are found in Africa.

Species:

- Macronycteris besaoka (†) (Samonds, 2007)
- Macronycteris commersoni (Geoffroy Saint-Hilaire, 1813)
- Macronycteris cryptovalorona (Goodman et al., 2016)
- Macronycteris gigas (Wagner, 1845)
- Macronycteris thomensis (Bocage, 1891)
- Macronycteris vittata (Peters, 1852)
