= List of hipposiderids =

Species in mammal family Hipposideridae

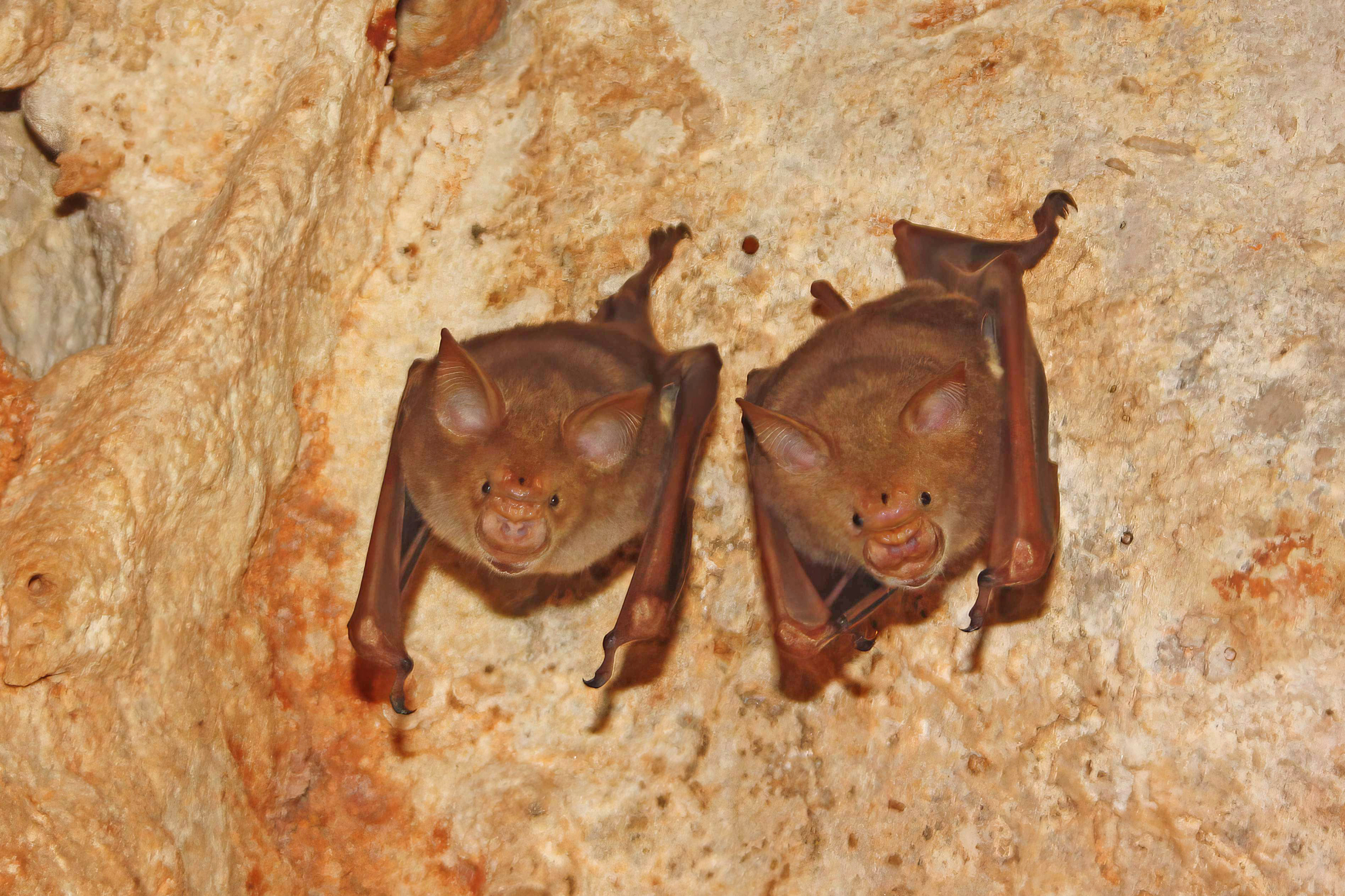
Commerson's leaf-nosed bat (Hipposideros commersoni)

Hipposideridae is one of the twenty families of bats in the mammalian order Chiroptera and part of the Yinpterochiroptera suborder. A member of this family is called a hipposiderid or an Old World leaf-nosed bat. They are named for their elongated, leaf-shaped nose. They are found in Africa, Asia, and Australia, primarily in forests, savannas, rocky areas, and caves, though some species can also be found in grasslands or wetlands. They range in size from the Malayan tailless leaf-nosed bat, at 3 cm (1 in) and no tail, to the striped leaf-nosed bat, at 13 cm (5 in) plus a 4 cm (2 in) tail. Like all bats, hipposiderids are capable of true and sustained flight, and have forearm lengths ranging from multiple species with 3 cm (1 in), to the giant roundleaf bat at 13 cm (5 in). They are all insectivorous and primarily eat cicadas, cockroaches, termites, and beetles, though some species may eat trace amounts of fruit while consuming insects within. Most hipposiderids do not have population estimates, but the ones that do range from 150 adult individuals to 10,000. The lesser great leaf-nosed bat, Makira roundleaf bat, Nicobar leaf-nosed bat, Pomona roundleaf bat, short-tailed roundleaf bat, Cox's roundleaf bat, and Sorensen's leaf-nosed bat are categorized as endangered species, and the Kolar leaf-nosed bat and Lamotte's roundleaf bat are categorized as critically endangered.

The 94 extant species of Hipposideridae are divided into seven genera; 76 of the species are in the Hipposideros genus. The other six genera are Anthops, Asellia, Aselliscus, Coelops, Doryrhina, and Macronycteris. A few extinct prehistoric hipposiderid species have been discovered, though due to ongoing research and discoveries the exact number and categorization is not fixed.

== Conventions ==
IUCN Red List categories
Conservation status
- EX: Extinct (0 species)
- EW: Extinct in the wild (0 species)
- CR: Critically endangered (2 species)
- EN: Endangered (7 species)
- VU: Vulnerable (15 species)
- NT: Near threatened (10 species)
- LC: Least concern (41 species)

Other categories
- DD: Data deficient (11 species)
- NE: Not evaluated (8 species)

The author citation for the species or genus is given after the scientific name; parentheses around the author citation indicate that this was not the original taxonomic placement. Conservation status codes listed follow the International Union for Conservation of Nature (IUCN) Red List of Threatened Species. Range maps are provided wherever possible; if a range map is not available, a description of the hipposiderid's range is provided. Ranges are based on the IUCN Red List for that species unless otherwise noted.

== Classification ==
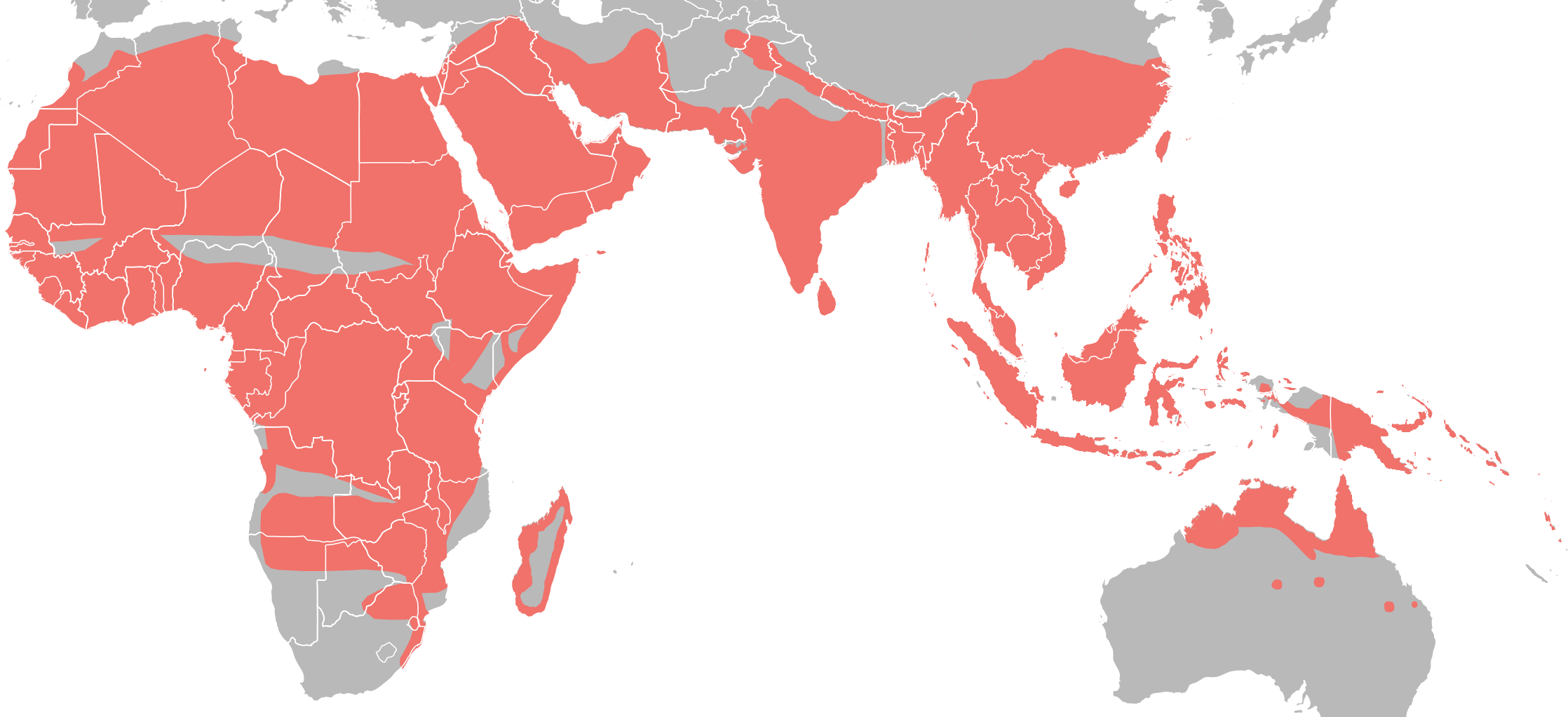
Hipposideridae distribution

The family Hipposideridae consists of 93 extant species in seven genera: Anthops, with one species; Asellia, containing four species; Aselliscus, containing three species; Coelops, containing three species; Doryrhina, containing two species; Hipposideros, containing 76 species; and Macronycteris, containing five species.

Family Hipposideridae

- Genus Anthops (flower-faced bat): one species
- Genus Asellia (trident bats): four species
- Genus Aselliscus (trident bats): three species
- Genus Coelops (tailless leaf-nosed bats): three species
- Genus Doryrhina (roundleaf bats): two species
- Genus Hipposideros (roundleaf bats): 76 species
- Genus Macronycteris (leaf-nosed bats): five species

- Hipposideridae
  - - Doryrhina
    - Macronycteris
  - - Asellia
    - - - Coelops
        - Aselliscus
      - - Hipposideros
        - Anthops

== Hipposiderids ==
The following classification is based on the taxonomy described by the reference work Mammal Species of the World (2005), with augmentation by generally accepted proposals made since using molecular phylogenetic analysis, as supported by both the IUCN SSC Bat Specialist Group and the American Society of Mammalogists.

Genus Anthops – Thomas, 1888 – one species
Common name	Scientific name and subspecies	Range	Size and ecology	IUCN status and estimated population
Flower-faced bat	A. ornatus Thomas, 1888	Papua New Guinea and the Solomon Islands	Size: 4–7 cm (2–3 in) long, plus 0.3–1 cm (0.1–0.4 in) tail 4–6 cm (2 in) forearm length Habitat: Forest and caves	VU Unknown

Genus Asellia – Gray, 1838 – four species
Common name	Scientific name and subspecies	Range	Size and ecology	IUCN status and estimated population
Arabian trident bat	A. arabica Benda, Vallo, & Reiter, 2011	Oman and Yemen	Size: 4–6 cm (2 in) long, plus 1–3 cm (0.4–1.2 in) tail 4–5 cm (2 in) forearm length Habitat: Savanna	DD Unknown
Patrizi's trident leaf-nosed bat	A. patrizii Beaux, 1931	Eritrea, Ethiopia, and Saudi Arabia	Size: 4–5 cm (2 in) long, plus 1–2 cm (0.4–0.8 in) tail 3–5 cm (1–2 in) forearm length Habitat: Shrubland, grassland, and caves	LC Unknown
Somalian trident bat	A. italosomalica Beaux, 1936	Horn of Africa	Size: 4–6 cm (2 in) long, plus 1–3 cm (0.4–1.2 in) tail 4–5 cm (2 in) forearm length Habitat: Savanna, shrubland, grassland, caves, and desert	DD Unknown
Trident bat	A. tridens (Geoffroy, 1813)	Northern Africa and Western Asia	Size: 4–6 cm (2 in) long, plus 1–3 cm (0.4–1.2 in) tail 4–6 cm (2 in) forearm length Habitat: Forest, savanna, shrubland, grassland, caves, and desert	LC Unknown

Genus Aselliscus – Tate, 1941 – three species
Common name	Scientific name and subspecies	Range	Size and ecology	IUCN status and estimated population
Dong Bac's trident bat	A. dongbacanus Tu et al., 2015	Northern Vietnam	Size: 3–5 cm (1–2 in) long, plus 3–5 cm (1–2 in) tail about 4 cm (2 in) forearm length Habitat: Forest and caves	NT Unknown
Stoliczka's trident bat	A. stoliczkanus (Dobson, 1871)	Southeastern Asia	Size: 4–5 cm (2 in) long, plus 3–5 cm (1–2 in) tail 3–5 cm (1–2 in) forearm length Habitat: Forest and caves	LC Unknown
Temminck's trident bat	A. tricuspidatus (Temminck, 1835)	Northern Oceania	Size: 3–5 cm (1–2 in) long, plus 1–3 cm (0.4–1.2 in) tail 3–5 cm (1–2 in) forearm length Habitat: Forest and caves	LC Unknown

Genus Coelops – Blyth, 1848 – three species
Common name	Scientific name and subspecies	Range	Size and ecology	IUCN status and estimated population
East Asian tailless leaf-nosed bat	C. frithii Blyth, 1848 Five subspecies: C. f. bernsteini; C. f. formosanus; C. f. frithii; C. f. inflatus; C. f. sinicus	Southeastern Asia	Size: 3–5 cm (1–2 in) long, with no tail 3–5 cm (1–2 in) forearm length Habitat: Forest and caves	NT Unknown
Philippine tailless leaf-nosed bat	C. hirsutus Miller, 1910	Philippines	Size: 3–5 cm (1–2 in) long, with no tail 3–4 cm (1–2 in) forearm length Habitat: Caves and forest	NE Unknown
Malayan tailless leaf-nosed bat	C. robinsoni Bonhote, 1908	Southeastern Asia	Size: 3–4 cm (1–2 in) long, with no tail 3–4 cm (1–2 in) forearm length Habitat: Caves and forest	VU Unknown

Genus Doryrhina – Peters, 1871 – two species
Common name	Scientific name and subspecies	Range	Size and ecology	IUCN status and estimated population
Greater roundleaf bat	D. camerunensis Eisentraut, 1956	Central Africa	Size: 9–10 cm (4 in) long, plus 2–5 cm (1–2 in) tail 7–8 cm (3–3 in) forearm length Habitat: Forest	DD Unknown
Cyclops roundleaf bat	D. cyclops Temminck, 1853	Central and western Africa	Size: 7–10 cm (3–4 in) long, plus 1–4 cm (0.4–1.6 in) tail 5–8 cm (2–3 in) forearm length Habitat: Forest and savanna	LC Unknown

Genus Hipposideros – Gray, 1831 – 70 species
Common name	Scientific name and subspecies	Range	Size and ecology	IUCN status and estimated population
Aba roundleaf bat	H. abae Allen, 1917	Central and western Africa	Size: 6–7 cm (2–3 in) long, plus 2–4 cm (1–2 in) tail 5–7 cm (2–3 in) forearm length Habitat: Savanna and rocky areas	LC Unknown
Aellen's roundleaf bat	H. marisae Aellen, 1954	Western Africa	Size: 4–5 cm (2 in) long, plus 1–3 cm (0.4–1.2 in) tail 3–5 cm (1–2 in) forearm length Habitat: Caves, rocky areas, and forest	VU Unknown
Allen's roundleaf bat	H. poutensis Allen, 1906	Eastern Asia	Size: 5–8 cm (2–3 in) long, plus 3–4 cm (1–2 in) tail 5–7 cm (2–3 in) forearm length Habitat: Forest and caves	NE Unknown
Andersen's leaf-nosed bat	H. gentilis Andersen, 1918	Southern and southeastern Asia	Size: About 4 cm (2 in) long, plus 2–4 cm (1–2 in) tail 3–5 cm (1–2 in) forearm length Habitat: Forest and caves	LC Unknown
Arnhem leaf-nosed bat	H. inornatus McKean, 1970	Northern Australia	Size: 6–8 cm (2–3 in) long, plus 3–5 cm (1–2 in) tail 6–8 cm (2–3 in) forearm length Habitat: Forest, savanna, shrubland, and caves	VU Unknown
Ashy roundleaf bat	H. cineraceus Blyth, 1853 Two subspecies: H. c. cineraceus; H. c. wrighti	Southern and southeastern Asia	Size: Unknown length 3–4 cm (1–2 in) forearm length Habitat: Forest and caves	LC Unknown
Benito roundleaf bat	H. beatus K. Andersen, 1906 Two subspecies: H. b. beatus; H. b. maximus	Central and western Africa	Size: 4–5 cm (2 in) long, plus 2–4 cm (1–2 in) tail 3–5 cm (1–2 in) forearm length Habitat: Forest and inland wetlands	LC Unknown
Biak roundleaf bat	H. papua (Thomas & Doria, 1886)	Indonesia	Size: 4–6 cm (2 in) long, plus 2–4 cm (1–2 in) tail 4–6 cm (2 in) forearm length Habitat: Forest and caves	LC Unknown
Bicolored roundleaf bat	H. bicolor (Temminck, 1834)	Southeastern Asia	Size: Unknown length 4–5 cm (2 in) forearm length Habitat: Forest and caves	LC Unknown
Big-eared roundleaf bat	H. macrobullatus Tate, 1941	Indonesia	Size: Unknown length 4–5 cm (2 in) forearm length Habitat: Forest and caves	DD Unknown
Boeadi's roundleaf bat	H. boeadii Rossiter, Suyanto, Kingston, & Bates, 2007	Indonesia	Size: Unknown length, plus 1–2 cm (0.4–0.8 in) tail 4–5 cm (2 in) forearm length Habitat: Forest	DD Unknown
Borneo roundleaf bat	H. doriae (Peters, 1871)	Southeastern Asia	Size: Unknown length 3–4 cm (1–2 in) forearm length Habitat: Forest	NT Unknown
Cantor's roundleaf bat	H. galeritus Cantor, 1846	Southern and southeastern Asia	Size: 4–6 cm (2 in) long, plus 2–4 cm (1–2 in) tail 4–6 cm (2 in) forearm length Habitat: Rocky areas, caves, and forest	LC Unknown
Cox's roundleaf bat	H. coxi Shelford, 1901	Western Borneo	Size: Unknown length 5–6 cm (2 in) forearm length Habitat: Unknown	EN Unknown
Crested roundleaf bat	H. inexpectatus Laurie & Hill, 1954	Indonesia	Size: Unknown length About 10 cm (4 in) forearm length Habitat: Caves and unknown	DD Unknown
Dayak roundleaf bat	H. dyacorum Thomas, 1902	Indonesia and Malaysia	Size: Unknown length 3–5 cm (1–2 in) forearm length Habitat: Forest and caves	LC Unknown
Diadem leaf-nosed bat	H. diadema (É. Geoffroy, 1813)	Southeastern Asia	Size: 6–10 cm (2–4 in) long, plus 3–6 cm (1–2 in) tail 5–10 cm (2–4 in) forearm length Habitat: Forest, savanna, and caves	LC Unknown
Dobson's roundleaf bat	H. brachyotus Dobson, 1874	India and Bangladesh	Size: 4–6 cm (2 in) long, plus 2–4 cm (1–2 in) tail 4–6 cm (2 in) forearm length Habitat: Rocky areas, caves, and forest	NE Unknown
Dusky leaf-nosed bat	H. ater Templeton, 1848 Six subspecies: H. a. amboinensis; H. a. aruensis; H. a. ater; H. a. gilberti; H. a. nicobarulae; H. a. saevus	Map of range	Size: 3–5 cm (1–2 in) long, plus 1–3 cm (0.4–1.2 in) tail 1–5 cm (0.4–2.0 in) forearm length Habitat: Forest, savanna, shrubland, and caves	LC Unknown
Ethiopian large-eared roundleaf bat	H. megalotis (Heuglin, 1862)	Eastern Africa	Size: About 4 cm (2 in) long, plus 2–3 cm (1 in) tail 3–4 cm (1–2 in) forearm length Habitat: Savanna and shrubland	LC Unknown
Fawn leaf-nosed bat	H. cervinus (Gould, 1854) Four subspecies: H. c. batchianus; H. c. cervinus; H. c. labuanensis; H. c. misoriensis	Southeastern Asia	Size: 5–6 cm (2 in) long, plus 2–4 cm (1–2 in) tail 4–6 cm (2 in) forearm length Habitat: Forest and caves	LC Unknown
Fierce roundleaf bat	H. dinops K. Andersen, 1905	Northeastern Oceania	Size: 8–11 cm (3–4 in) long, plus 5–7 cm (2–3 in) tail 8–10 cm (3–4 in) forearm length Habitat: Forest and caves	VU 6,000
Fly River roundleaf bat	H. muscinus (Thomas & Doria, 1886)	New Guinea	Size: 4–6 cm (2 in) long, plus about 2 cm (1 in) tail 4–5 cm (2 in) forearm length Habitat: Forest	LC Unknown
Fulvus roundleaf bat	H. fulvus Gray, 1838	Southern Asia	Size: 4–5 cm (2 in) long, plus 2–4 cm (1–2 in) tail 3–5 cm (1–2 in) forearm length Habitat: Forest and caves	LC Unknown
Grand roundleaf bat	H. grandis Allen, 1936	Southeastern Asia	Size: 6–8 cm (2–3 in) long, plus 3–5 cm (1–2 in) tail 5–7 cm (2–3 in) forearm length Habitat: Caves and unknown	LC Unknown
Great roundleaf bat	H. armiger (Hodgson, 1835) Four subspecies: H. a. armiger; H. a. fujianensis; H. a. terasensis; H. a. tranninhensis	Eastern and southeastern Asia	Size: 8–11 cm (3–4 in) long, plus 4–7 cm (2–3 in) tail 8–11 cm (3–4 in) forearm length Habitat: Forest and caves	LC Unknown
Griffin's leaf-nosed bat	H. griffini Thong et al., 2012	Vietnam	Size: Unknown length 8–9 cm (3–4 in) forearm length Habitat: Forest and caves	NT Unknown
Ha Long leaf-nosed bat	H. alongensis Bourret, 1942	Vietnam	Size: Unknown length 6–8 cm (2–3 in) forearm length Habitat: Forest and caves	VU 9,000
Hill's roundleaf bat	H. edwardshilli Flannery & Colgan, 1993	Northern Papua New Guinea	Size: About 5 cm (2 in) long, plus 1–2 cm (0.4–0.8 in) tail 4–6 cm (2 in) forearm length Habitat: Forest and caves	VU Unknown
House-dwelling leaf-nosed bat	H. einnaythu Douangboubpha et al., 2011	Myanmar	Size: Unknown length 3–4 cm (1–2 in) forearm length Habitat: Unknown	DD Unknown
Indian roundleaf bat	H. lankadiva Kelaart, 1850	Southern Asia	Size: Unknown length, plus 3–6 cm (1–2 in) tail 7–10 cm (3–4 in) forearm length Habitat: Forest, shrubland, and caves	LC Unknown
Intermediate roundleaf bat	H. larvatus (Horsfield, 1823)	Southeastern Asia	Size: 5–8 cm (2–3 in) long, plus 3–4 cm (1–2 in) tail 5–7 cm (2–3 in) forearm length Habitat: Forest and caves	LC Unknown
Jones's roundleaf bat	H. jonesi Hayman, 1947	Western Africa	Size: 5–6 cm (2 in) long, plus 1–3 cm (0.4–1.2 in) tail 4–5 cm (2 in) forearm length Habitat: Forest, savanna, grassland, rocky areas, and caves	NT Unknown
Khajuria's leaf-nosed bat	H. durgadasi Khajuria, 1970	Central India	Size: 3–5 cm (1–2 in) long, plus 2–3 cm (1 in) tail 3–4 cm (1–2 in) forearm length Habitat: Forest and caves	VU Unknown
Kingston's roundleaf bat	H. kingstonae Wongwaiyut, Karapan, Saekong, Francis, Guillén-Servent, Senawi, Anwarali Khan, Bates, Jantarit, & Soisook, 2023	Southeastern Asia	Size: Unknown length 3–4 cm (1–2 in) forearm length Habitat: Forest and caves	NE Unknown
Kolar leaf-nosed bat	H. hypophyllus Kock & Bhat, 1994	Southern India	Size: 4–5 cm (2 in) long, plus 2–3 cm (1 in) tail 3–5 cm (1–2 in) forearm length Habitat: Shrubland and caves	CR 150–200
Kunz's roundleaf bat	H. kunzi Murray, Khan, Kingston, Zubaid, & Campbell, 2028	Thailand and Malaysia	Size: Unknown length 3–5 cm (1–2 in) forearm length Habitat: Forest and caves	NE Unknown
Lamotte's roundleaf bat	H. lamottei (Brosset, 1984)	Western Africa	Size: 9–11 cm (4 in) long, plus 3–5 cm (1–2 in) tail 5–6 cm (2 in) forearm length Habitat: Forest, grassland, and caves	CR Unknown
Laotian leaf-nosed bat	H. rotalis Francis, Kock, & Habersetzer, 1999	Laos	Size: Unknown length, plus 3–4 cm (1–2 in) tail 4–5 cm (2 in) forearm length Habitat: Forest	LC Unknown
Large Asian roundleaf bat	H. lekaguli Thonglongya & Hill, 1974	Southeastern Asia	Size: Unknown length 6–8 cm (2–3 in) forearm length Habitat: Forest and caves	NT Unknown
Large Mindanao roundleaf bat	H. coronatus Peters, 1871	Philippines	Size: 8–9 cm (3–4 in) long, plus 2–3 cm (1 in) tail About 5 cm (2 in) forearm length Habitat: Forest and caves	DD Unknown
Lesser great leaf-nosed bat	H. turpis Bangs, 1901	Japan	Size: 6–9 cm (2–4 in) long, plus 4–6 cm (2 in) tail 6–8 cm (2–3 in) forearm length Habitat: Forest, inland wetlands, and caves	EN Unknown
Maduran leaf-nosed bat	H. madurae Kitchener & Maryanto, 1993	Indonesia	Size: Unknown length, plus 2–4 cm (1–2 in) tail 5–6 cm (2 in) forearm length Habitat: Forest and caves	NT Unknown
Maggie Taylor's roundleaf bat	H. maggietaylorae Smith & Hill, 1981 Two subspecies: H. m. erroris; H. m. maggietaylorae	New Guinea and nearby islands	Size: 5–8 cm (2–3 in) long, plus 3–5 cm (1–2 in) tail 5–7 cm (2–3 in) forearm length Habitat: Caves, shrubland, and forest	LC Unknown
Maghreb Leaf-nosed Bat	H. tephrus Cabrera, 1906	Morocco, Yemen, and Senegal	Size: 4–5 cm (2 in) long, plus 2–4 cm (1–2 in) tail Unknown forearm length Habitat: Forest and savanna	LC Unknown
Makira roundleaf bat	H. demissus K. Andersen, 1909	Solomon Islands	Size: 6–7 cm (2–3 in) long, plus 3–5 cm (1–2 in) tail About 7 cm (3 in) forearm length Habitat: Forest and caves	EN Unknown
Malayan roundleaf bat	H. nequam K. Andersen, 1918	Malaysia	Size: Unknown length About 5 cm (2 in) forearm length Habitat: Unknown	DD Unknown
Nicobar leaf-nosed bat	H. nicobarulae Miller, 1902	Nicobar Islands	Size: Unknown length 3–5 cm (1–2 in) forearm length Habitat: Forest and caves	EN Unknown
Noack's roundleaf bat	H. ruber Noack, 1893 Two subspecies: H. r. guineensis; H. r. ruber	Sub-Saharan Africa	Size: 5–7 cm (2–3 in) long, plus 3–5 cm (1–2 in) tail 4–6 cm (2 in) forearm length Habitat: Forest, savanna, and caves	LC Unknown
Northern leaf-nosed bat	H. stenotis Thomas, 1913	Northern Australia	Size: 4–5 cm (2 in) long, plus 2–3 cm (1 in) tail 4–5 cm (2 in) forearm length Habitat: Savanna, rocky areas, and caves	VU 5,000
Orbiculus leaf-nosed bat	H. orbiculus Francis, Kock, & Habersetzer, 1999	Sumatra island in Indonesia and Malaysia	Size: Unknown length, plus 2–4 cm (1–2 in) tail 4–5 cm (2 in) forearm length Habitat: Forest	VU Unknown
Peleng leaf-nosed bat	H. pelingensis Shamel, 1940	Sulawesi island in Indonesia	Size: Unknown length 9–10 cm (4 in) forearm length Habitat: Forest and caves	NT Unknown
Pendlebury's roundleaf bat	H. pendleburyi Chasen, 1936	Thailand	Size: Unknown length, plus 4–7 cm (2–3 in) tail 7–9 cm (3–4 in) forearm length Habitat: Forest and caves	VU 4,700
Philippine dusky roundleaf bat	H. antricola Peters, 1861	Philippines	Size: 4–5 cm (2 in) long, plus 3–4 cm (1–2 in) tail 3–5 cm (1–2 in) forearm length Habitat: Forest, savanna, shrubland, and caves	NE Unknown
Philippine forest roundleaf bat	H. obscurus (Peters, 1861)	Philippines	Size: 5–6 cm (2 in) long, plus 1–3 cm (0.4–1.2 in) tail 4–5 cm (2 in) forearm length Habitat: Forest and caves	LC Unknown
Philippine pygmy roundleaf bat	H. pygmaeus (Waterhouse, 1843)	Philippines	Size: 5–8 cm (2–3 in) long, plus 1–3 cm (0.4–1.2 in) tail 3–5 cm (1–2 in) forearm length Habitat: Forest and caves	LC Unknown
Phou Khao Khouay leaf-nosed bat	H. khaokhouayensis Guillén-Servent & Francis, 2009	Laos and Vietnam	Size: Unknown length 4–5 cm (2 in) forearm length Habitat: Forest	VU 8,000–10,000
Pomona roundleaf bat	H. pomona K. Andersen, 1918	India	Size: Unknown length 3–4 cm (1–2 in) forearm length Habitat: Forest and caves	EN Unknown
Ridley's leaf-nosed bat	H. ridleyi Robinson & Kloss, 1911	Southeastern Asia	Size: Unknown length, plus 2–3 cm (1 in) tail 4–6 cm (2 in) forearm length Habitat: Forest	VU Unknown
Schneider's leaf-nosed bat	H. speoris (Schneider, 1800)	India	Size: 4–7 cm (2–3 in) long 4–6 cm (2 in) forearm length Habitat: Forest, shrubland, rocky areas, and caves	LC Unknown
Semon's leaf-nosed bat	H. semoni Matschie, 1903	Northeastern Australia	Size: 4–5 cm (2 in) long, plus 2–3 cm (1 in) tail 3–5 cm (1–2 in) forearm length Habitat: Forest, savanna, and caves	LC Unknown
Shield-faced roundleaf bat	H. lylei Thomas, 1913	Southeastern Asia	Size: 7–10 cm (3–4 in) long, plus 4–6 cm (2 in) tail 7–9 cm (3–4 in) forearm length Habitat: Forest and caves	LC Unknown
Shield-nosed leaf-nosed bat	H. scutinares Robinson, Jenkins, Francis, & Fulford, 2003	Laos and Vietnam	Size: Unknown length, plus 5–6 cm (2 in) tail 7–9 cm (3–4 in) forearm length Habitat: Forest and caves	VU 8,000–10,000
Short-headed roundleaf bat	H. breviceps Tate, 1941	Indonesia	Size: About 4 cm (2 in) long, plus about 2 cm (1 in) tail About 4 cm (2 in) forearm length Habitat: Forest and caves	DD Unknown
Short-tailed roundleaf bat	H. curtus Allen, 1921	Cameroon and Equatorial Guinea	Size: 5–6 cm (2 in) long, plus 1–3 cm (0.4–1.2 in) tail 4–5 cm (2 in) forearm length Habitat: Forest and caves	EN Unknown
Sooty roundleaf bat	H. fuliginosus (Temminck, 1853)	Central and western Africa	Size: 8–10 cm (3–4 in) long, plus 2–4 cm (1–2 in) tail 5–6 cm (2 in) forearm length Habitat: Forest	LC Unknown
Sorensen's leaf-nosed bat	H. sorenseni Kitchener, 1993	Indonesia	Size: 5–6 cm (2 in) long, plus 3–4 cm (1–2 in) tail 5–6 cm (2 in) forearm length Habitat: Caves	EN Unknown
Spurred roundleaf bat	H. calcaratus (Dobson, 1877) Two subspecies: H. c. calcaratus; H. c. cupidus	Papua New Guinea and the Solomon Islands	Size: 4–7 cm (2–3 in) long, plus 3–5 cm (1–2 in) tail 4–6 cm (2 in) forearm length Habitat: Forest and caves	LC Unknown
Sri Lankan roundleaf bat	H. srilankaensis Kusuminda, Srinivasulu, Amarasinghe, Srinivasulu, Srinivasulu, & Yapa, 2025	Sri Lanka	Size: 4–6 cm (2 in) long, plus 2–4 cm (1–2 in) tail 4–6 cm (2 in) forearm length Habitat: Rocky areas, caves, and forest	NE Unknown
Sumba roundleaf bat	H. sumbae (Oei, 1960)	Indonesia and East Timor	Size: Unknown length, plus 2–4 cm (1–2 in) tail 4–6 cm (2 in) forearm length Habitat: Caves	LC Unknown
Sundevall's roundleaf bat	H. caffer (Sundevall, 1846) Three subspecies: H. c. angolensis; H. c. caffer; H. c. nanus	Africa and southern Arabian Peninsula	Size: 4–6 cm (2 in) long, plus 2–4 cm (1–2 in) tail 4–6 cm (2 in) forearm length Habitat: Forest, savanna, shrubland, inland wetlands, and caves	LC Unknown
Swinhoe's roundleaf bat	H. swinhoii Peters, 1871	Eastern Asia	Size: 9–11 cm (4 in) long, plus 5–7 cm (2–3 in) tail 7–9 cm (3–4 in) forearm length Habitat: Caves	LC Unknown
Telefomin roundleaf bat	H. corynophyllus Hill, 1985	New Guinea	Size: 5–7 cm (2–3 in) long, plus 0.5–2 cm (0.2–0.8 in) tail 4–6 cm (2 in) forearm length Habitat: Forest and caves	LC Unknown
Thailand roundleaf bat	H. halophyllus Hill & Yenbutra, 1984	Thailand	Size: Unknown length 3–4 cm (1–2 in) forearm length Habitat: Forest and caves	VU 2,500–10,000
Timor roundleaf bat	H. crumeniferus Lesueur & Petit, 1807	Indonesia	Size: Unknown Habitat: Forest	DD Unknown
Wollaston's roundleaf bat	H. wollastoni Thomas, 1913 Three subspecies: H. w. fasensis; H. w. parnabyi; H. w. wollastoni	New Guinea	Size: 4–5 cm (2 in) long, plus about 3 cm (1 in) tail About 4 cm (2 in) forearm length Habitat: Forest and caves	LC Unknown

Genus Macronycteris – Gray, 1866 – five species
Common name	Scientific name and subspecies	Range	Size and ecology	IUCN status and estimated population
Commerson's roundleaf bat	M. commersonii Geoffroy, 1813	Madagascar	Size: 10–11 cm (4 in) long, plus 3–5 cm (1–2 in) tail 8–11 cm (3–4 in) forearm length Habitat: Forest and caves	NT Unknown
Giant roundleaf bat	M. gigas Wagner, 1845	Central and western Africa	Size: 9–12 cm (4–5 in) long, plus 2–5 cm (1–2 in) tail 9–13 cm (4–5 in) forearm length Habitat: Forest, savanna, rocky areas, and caves	LC Unknown
Madagascar cryptic leaf-nosed bat	M. cryptovalorona Goodman, Schoeman, Rakotoarivelo, & Willows-Munro, 2016	Madagascar	Size: 8–10 cm (3–4 in), plus 3–4 cm (1–2 in) tail 8–9 cm (3–4 in) forearm length Habitat: Forest and caves	NE Unknown
São Tomé leaf-nosed bat	M. thomensis Bocage, 1891	São Tomé Island	Size: 10–11 cm (4 in) long, plus 2–3 cm (1 in) tail Habitat: Forest and caves	LC Unknown
Striped leaf-nosed bat	M. vittata (Peters, 1852)	Sub-Saharan Africa	Size: 9–13 cm (4–5 in) long, plus 2–4 cm (1–2 in) tail 8–11 cm (3–4 in) forearm length Habitat: Forest, savanna, and caves	NT Unknown

== Sources ==
- Chernasky, Amy; Motis, Anna; Burgin, Connor, eds. (2023). All the Mammals of the World. Lynx Nature Books. ISBN 978-84-16728-66-4.
- Simmons, Nancy B. (2005). Wilson, Don E.; Reeder, DeeAnn M. (eds.). Mammal Species of the World. Vol. 1 (3rd ed.). Johns Hopkins University Press. ISBN 978-0-8018-8221-0.
