= Hipposideros srilankaensis =

Scientific classification
- Kingdom: Animalia
- Phylum: Chordata
- Class: Mammalia
- Order: Chiroptera
- Family: Hipposideridae
- Genus: Hipposideros
- Species: H. srilankaensis

Binomial name
- Hipposideros srilankaensis Kusuminda et al., 2025

Bat species endemic to Sri Lanka

Hipposideros srilankaensis is a species of Old World leaf-nosed bat species endemic to Sri Lanka. It was described in 2025 based on a taxonomic split of Cantor's roundleaf bat (Hipposideros galeritus).

== See also ==
- List of living mammal species described in the 2020s
- List of hipposiderids
