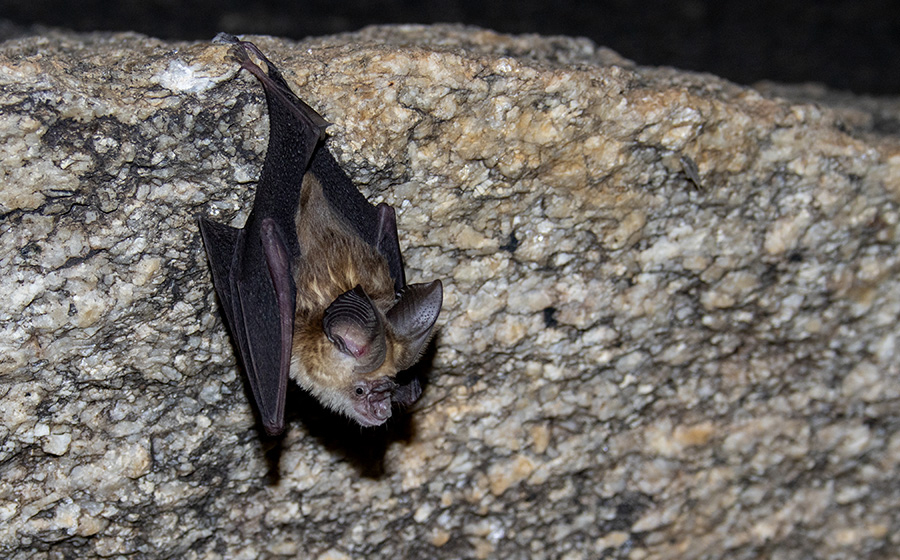
- The bat at its only known roost in Hanumanahalli, Kolar, Karnataka

Conservation status
- Critically Endangered (IUCN 3.1)]

Scientific classification
- Kingdom: Animalia
- Phylum: Chordata
- Class: Mammalia
- Order: Chiroptera
- Family: Hipposideridae
- Genus: Hipposideros
- Species: H. hypophyllus

Binomial name
- Hipposideros hypophyllus Kock & Bhat, 1994
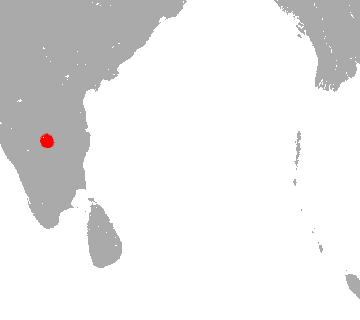
- Kolar leaf-nosed bat range

= Kolar leaf-nosed bat =

Endanged species of bat found in India

The Kolar leaf-nosed bat (Hipposideros hypophyllus), or leafletted leaf-nosed bat is a species of bat in the family Hipposideridae. It is endemic to India. Its natural habitats are subtropical or tropical dry forests and caves. It is found in only one cave in India, and its population is less than 200 individuals.

== Taxonomy ==
This species was described in 1994. The Hipposideros bats of South Asia are divided into closely related species groups. The Kolar leaf-nosed bat is placed in the "bicolor" species group, which is characterized by the absence of secondary leaflets on their nose-leaves and a forearm length of 33–44 mm (1.3–1.7 in). It is most closely related to Cantor's roundleaf bat and the fawn leaf-nosed bat; these three species form a clade in the genus Hipposideros.

== Description ==
Its forearm is 38–49 mm (1.5–1.9 in) long. The fur on its back is variable in color, with some individuals' hairs tipped with grayish-brown, while others' hairs are tipped with rufous brown. Fur on the ventral surface is tipped in white or fulvous-white. Its nose-leaf has two supplementary leaflets that project from underneath the sides of the front nose-leaf. Its ears are 16.7–17.7 mm (0.66–0.70 in) long; its tail is 23.3–24.3 mm (0.92–0.96 in) long; its hind feet are 6.7–6.9 mm (0.26–0.27 in); its nose-leaf is 5.5–5.8 mm (0.22–0.23 in) wide.

== Biology ==
It echolocates at 103–105.3kHz. During the day, it roosts in caves. It has been documented sharing a roost site with several other species of bat, including Khajuria's leaf-nosed bat (Hipposideros durgadasi), fulvus roundleaf bat (Hipposideros fulvus), and Schneider's leaf-nosed bat (Hipposideros speoris). It accumulates fat in the winter months, suggesting that it may use torpor in colder months. Pregnant and lactating females have been observed late in the summer.

== Range and habitat ==
It is known from only one cave in Hanumanahalli village in the Kolar district of the state of Karnataka in India. Its cave is described as an inaccessibly narrow opening in granite rocks. It was previously reported from a cave in Therhalli village, but it is absent from that cave as of 2014. It has not been encountered at elevations above 570 m (1,870 ft). The habitat surrounding its single remaining cave consists of tropical dry shrubland.

== Conservation ==
It is currently evaluated as critically endangered by the IUCN. The Kolar leaf-nosed bat is found in only one cave, and its population is around 200-250 individuals. This cave was not on protected land, and until 2014, the granite hill was under threat due to illegal blast-mining. Granite mining activity, and fires set in caves by miners, drove out two other satellite colonies on the site. In 2014 however, there was a temporary mining ban on the hill. In 2019, an area of 225 acres comprising the hill and its immediate surroundings were designated as the Kolar Leaf-nosed Bat Conservation Reserve by the Government of Karnataka. The species was assessed as Critically Endangered in 2016 based on a proposal in 2014 by a team of researchers led by Bhargavi Srinivasulu; from 2004–2016, it was listed as Endangered. From 2000–2004 it was listed as Vulnerable, and from 1996–2000, it was listed as Near Threatened. There had been petitions to protect the species under the Indian Wildlife Protection Act, 1972, as all bats in India were considered vermin with the exception of two species until 2022. In 2022, the Indian Wildlife Protection Act was amended to add four more bat species, including the Kolar leaf-nosed bat, to Schedule I, allowing it the highest legal protection in the country.
