= Orbiculus leaf-nosed bat =

Conservation status
- Vulnerable (IUCN 3.1)

Scientific classification
- Kingdom: Animalia
- Phylum: Chordata
- Class: Mammalia
- Order: Chiroptera
- Family: Hipposideridae
- Genus: Hipposideros
- Species: H. orbiculus

Binomial name
- Hipposideros orbiculus Francis, Kock & Habersetzer, 1999
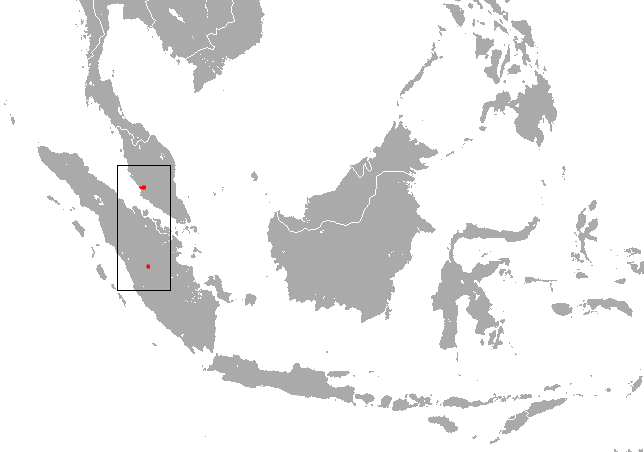
- Range map 2011

Species of bat

The orbiculus leaf-nosed bat (Hipposideros orbiculus), also known as the orbiculus roundleaf bat and small disc roundleaf bat, is a species of bat from the family Hipposideridae. The species has been found on the island of Sumatra in Indonesia and on peninsular Malaysia.

== Taxonomy ==
The orbiculus leaf-nosed bat was described as a new species in 1999. The holotype had been collected in Abai Siat, which is southeast of Kota Bharu on the Indonesian island of Sumatra. It is cryptic species with the Ridley's leaf-nosed bat, though the two can be differentiated based on their echolocation characteristics: the frequencies of the two species' calls differ by 19 kHz.

== Description ==
Its forearm length is 46.15–48.50 mm (1.817–1.909 in). Its tail is 26.2–34.2 mm (1.03–1.35 in) long and its ears are 20.6–23.6 mm (0.81–0.93 in) long. It echolocates at around 80 kHz.

== Range and status ==
The orbiculus leaf-nosed bat has been documented in three areas: West Sumatra of Indonesia, near Rawang, Selangor of Malaysia, and Sungkai Wildlife Forest Reserve, which is also in Malaysia.

As of 2015, the orbiculus leaf-nosed bat ess listed as a vulnerable species on the IUCN Red List because of its small extent of occurrence and continuing decline of the extent and quality of its habitat, as well as its population. It had previously been listed as an endangered species but was reevaluated because its extent of occurrence was recalculated to 20,345 km^{2} (7,855 mi^{2}). The orbiculus leaf-nosed bat is a terrestrial species that prefers lowland rainforests, and its habitat is degrading due to logging, agriculture, infrastructure development, plantations, and forest fire.
