= Malayan tailless leaf-nosed bat =

Malayan Tailless Leaf-nosed Bat

Conservation status
- Vulnerable (IUCN 3.1)

Scientific classification
- Kingdom: Animalia
- Phylum: Chordata
- Class: Mammalia
- Order: Chiroptera
- Family: Hipposideridae
- Genus: Coelops
- Species: C. robinsoni

Binomial name
- Coelops robinsoni Bonhote, 1908
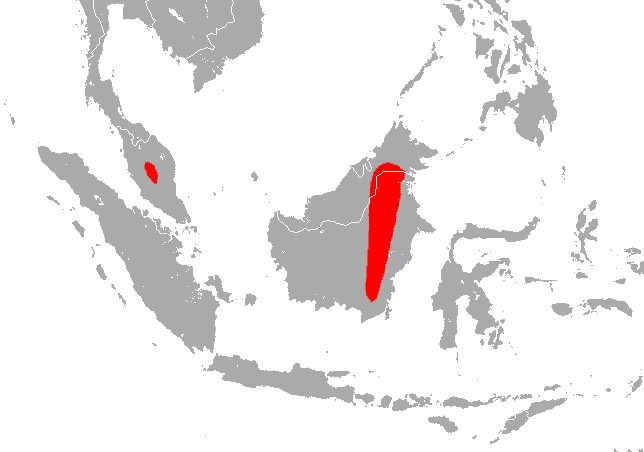
- Malayan Tailless Leaf-nosed Bat range

Species of bat

The Malayan tailless leaf-nosed bat (Coelops robinsoni) is a species of bat in the family Hipposideridae. It is a very small bat which has long and soft fur. The fur coloration is brown to blackish on the dorsal surface and ashy on the ventral surface. It can be distinguished from the other roundleaf bats by its small size and the absence of the tail. It is listed as vulnerable by the IUCN.

== Biology ==
In Thailand, this species is known to form small colonies inhabiting caves and is considered a rare species. In Peninsular Malaysia, the species has been recorded roosting in a cave and in the hollow buttress of a tree and shares its roosting site with Hipposideros ridleyi.

In the Philippines, this species was previously known as C. hirsutus and recorded only from Mindoro Island. However, it was suggested that C. hirsutus was a conspecific species of C. robinsoni. Until now, the ecology and habitat preference is still poorly known, due mainly to the species being difficult to catch. Throughout its distribution it is not known whether the small number of specimens is due to low population numbers or it has a high level of trap and net avoidance due to a combination of flight pattern and sensitive echolocation.

== Distributions ==
In Sarawak, it is only recorded from eastern part of Sarawak (Bintulu, Niah National Park and Gunung Mulu National Park). The distribution of this bat is restricted to the Southeast Asian region from Peninsular Thailand, Peninsular Malaysia and Borneo and possibly to Philippines.
