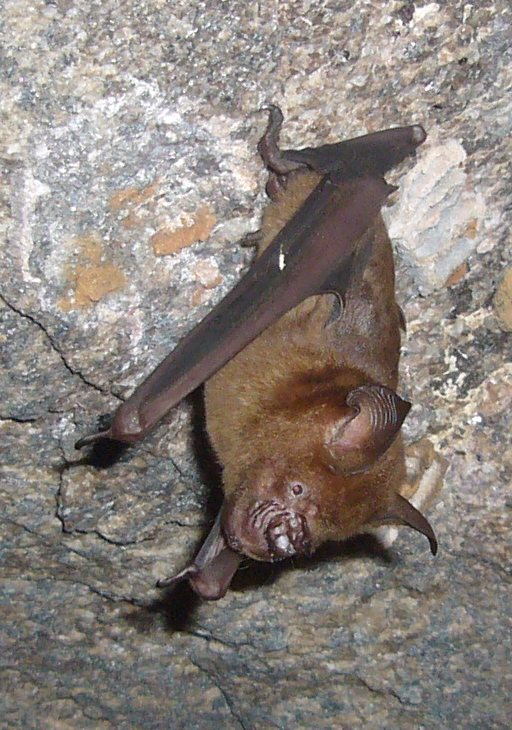

Conservation status
- Least Concern (IUCN 3.1)

Scientific classification
- Kingdom: Animalia
- Phylum: Chordata
- Class: Mammalia
- Infraclass: Placentalia
- Order: Chiroptera
- Family: Hipposideridae
- Genus: Hipposideros
- Species: H. lankadiva

Binomial name
- Hipposideros lankadiva Kelaart, 1850
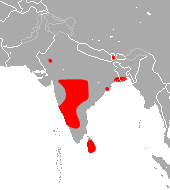
- Indian roundleaf bat range

Synonyms
- Hipposideros schistaceus

= Indian roundleaf bat =

Species of bat

The Indian roundleaf bat (Hipposideros lankadiva), also known as the large Ceylon leaf-nosed bat or Kelaart's leaf-nosed bat, is a species of bat in the family Hipposideridae. It is endemic to the Indian subcontinent, with marginal populations also detected in Southeast Asia. Its natural habitats are subtropical or tropical dry forests and caves. The bat has three subspecies that occur in India, Sri Lanka, and Myanmar. The Indian subspecies, H. l. indus, is smaller than the ones found in Sri Lanka and Myanmar, although there are no other characteristics that differentiate the subspecies.

H. lankadiva is a large leaf-nosed bat and is yellowish-brown in color. A key trait of the bats is the reduced fourth supplementary leaflet on the noseleaf, along with a lack of a fleshy elevation behind the posterior nose-leaf and the absence of white patches on the shoulders, which helps differentiate from similar species such as H. armiger and H. diadema.

The bat has been assessed by the IUCN as least concern, although the species is threatened in parts of its range by roost disturbance and collection for consumption and medicinal use.

== Taxonomy ==
The species was described by Kandy in the central hills of Sri Lanka. Anderson considered the species to be restricted to Sri Lanka, but then also recorded it from Bhamo in Myanmar on the basis on two immature specimens. Anderson then described 5 taxa from India: H. indus indus from Gersoppa, which he distinguished from H. lankadiva on the basis of size; two new subspecies, H. i. mixtus from Kolar and H. i. unitus from Mundra; and one additional species, H. schistaceus from Vijayanagar. Kemp reported specimens of H. lankadiva from the Siju Cave in the Garo Hills in India. Tate included lankadiva, unitus, indus, mixtus, and schistaceus in a 'mainland offshoot of the diadema group' in 1941, but did not specify their taxonomic status. Hill treated indus as a distinguishable subspecies of H. lankadiva and mixtus as a synonym. He included unitus as a subspecies of H. lankadiva without comment. H. schistaceus was maintained as a separate species. This arrangement was followed by Corbet and Hill who considered the distribution of H. lankadiva as being confined to central and southern peninsular India and Sri Lanka.

Upon the collection of specimens in West Bengal, Agrawal suggested a review of the status of subspecies of the bat was necessary. Bates and Harrison included all specimens of H. lankavida from Sri Lanka in the nominate subspecies H. l. lankadiva. This material averaged significantly larger than those seen from throughout peninsular India. All Indian material was referred to H. lankadiva indus, with schistaceus, mixtus and unitus also included as synonyms.

The taxon Hipposideros schistaceus was previously considered to be a distinct species, but is now considered a synonym of H. lankadiva.

The bat belongs to the diadema species group within the genus Hipposideros. There are 3 subspecies of the bat:

- Hipposideros lankadiva lankadiva (Kelaart, 1850)
- Hipposideros lankadiva indus (Andersen, 1918)
- Hipposideros lankadiva gyi (Bates et al. 2015)

== Description ==
The Indian roundleaf bat is large species of leaf-nosed bat. The pelage ranges from pale cream to brown and is darker on the head and shoulders, being relatively paler on the belly. They have an average forearm length of 83.5 mm (3.29 in), with a range of 75–99 mm (3.0–3.9 in). The average weight is 59 g (2.1 oz).

The bat has four supplementary leaflets on its nose-leaf, with the fourth leaflet being reduced. The intermediate leaf is expanded, with an inflated and swollen central part, and an evenly concave surface. The posterior leaf is brown and its upper border is trilobate. The ears of the species are large and acutely pointed, and had their posterior margins slightly concave behind the tip.

The bats found in Myanmar are considerably larger than those found in India, and are comparable in size to those found in Sri Lanka.

== Biology ==
This bat does not hibernate.

=== Reproduction ===
The bats mate once a year. They have a gestation period of 260 days, after which a single young is born.

=== Diet ===
The Indian roundleaf bat is an insectivore. Its diet is composed mainly of coleoepterans, especially scarabaeids, and other large, hard-bodied, and slow-flying insects, like nuptial ants and bugs. The high proportion (79–100%) of beetles in the feces of these bats in Sri Lanka suggest that they forage for food selectively.

=== Echolocation ===
The Indian roundleaf bat echolocates at a very low frequency, with the calls having a mean frequency of 78.33 kHz, with a range of 62.96–82.96 kHz. The species' calls have a comparatively short CF component and a longer tampering FM component, suggesting that the bat uses these to hunt insects in narrow spaces. This can also be explained considering that the bats roost in deep recesses with narrow openings.

The cochlea of this bat is at an intermediate state between that of non-specialized bats and long-constant-frequency bats.

== Distribution and habitat ==
The Indian roundleaf bat is found patchily but widely across the Indian subcontinent, with some records also being found in Myanmar in Southeast Asia. In India, it is found in the states of Andhra Pradesh, Karnataka, Madhya Pradesh, Maharashtra, Manipur, Meghalaya, Mizoram, Orissa, Rajasthan, Telangana, Tripura, and West Bengal. In Sri Lanka, it is found in the Central, Eastern, North Central, Sabaragamuwa, Southern, Uva and Western provinces. It has been recorded in Netrokona in Bangladesh. The bat has also been recorded in Kachin state in Myanmar.

The bat has a wide but patchy distribution through a variety of habitats. Despite its wide distribution, the bat is known only from a few locations in India and Sri Lanka. In Sri Lanka, the bat is known from the southern dry zone, lower foothills and wet zone hills. It is found up to an elevation of 1,000 meters above sea level.

It is a gregarious species roosting in groups of 50 to several thousand individuals. It roosts in caves, old disused tunnels, old temples, old forts, dark deep channels under dam sites and cellars under old buildings.

== Conservation ==
The Indian roundleaf bat has been assessed as being of least concern by the IUCN because of its wide distribution, its tolerance of a number of different habitats, its large population, and lack of significant population decline. Threats to the bat include roost disturbance, as the bat seems to be extra-sensitive to disturbance of roosts, and the collection of the bats for medicinal and biological use.
