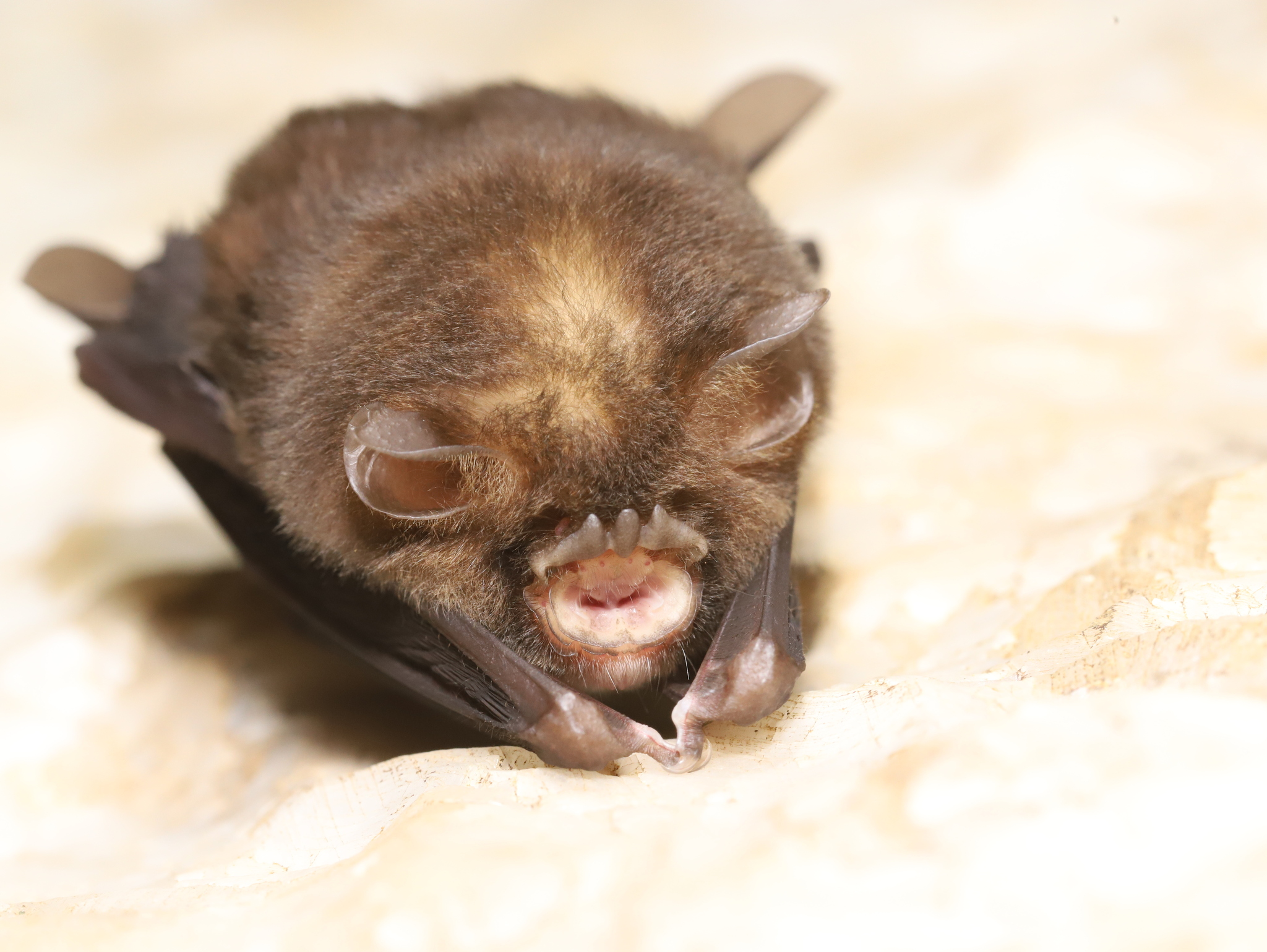

Conservation status
- Near Threatened (IUCN 3.1)

Scientific classification
- Kingdom: Animalia
- Phylum: Chordata
- Class: Mammalia
- Infraclass: Placentalia
- Order: Chiroptera
- Family: Hipposideridae
- Genus: Aselliscus
- Species: A. dongbacanus

Binomial name
- Aselliscus dongbacanus Vuong, et al. 2015
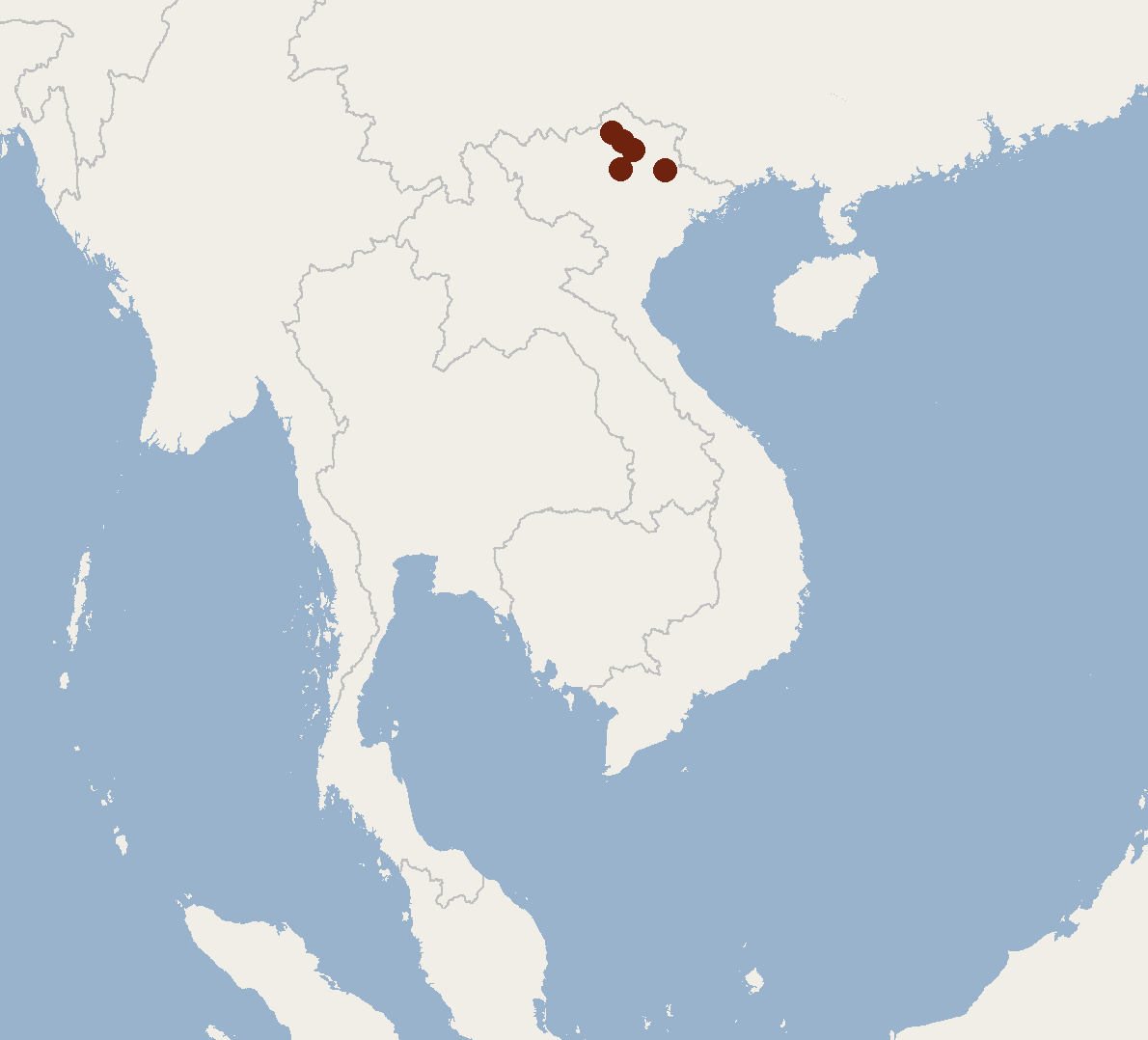

= Dong Bac's trident bat =

Species of bat

Dong Bac's trident bat (Aselliscus dongbacanus) is a species of bat in the family Hipposideridae. It is found in northeastern Vietnam. Its type locality is Na Phong cave, Ba Be National Park, Bac Kan Province, Vietnam.

Aselliscus dongbacanus is estimated to have diverged from Aselliscus stoliczkanus during the late Miocene.
