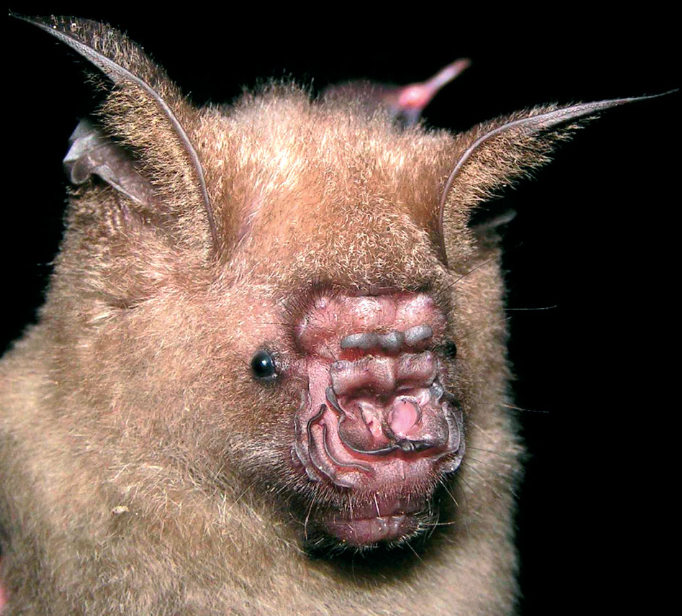

Conservation status
- Vulnerable (IUCN 3.1)

Scientific classification
- Kingdom: Animalia
- Phylum: Chordata
- Class: Mammalia
- Order: Chiroptera
- Family: Hipposideridae
- Genus: Hipposideros
- Species: H. pendleburyi

Binomial name
- Hipposideros pendleburyi Chasen, 1936
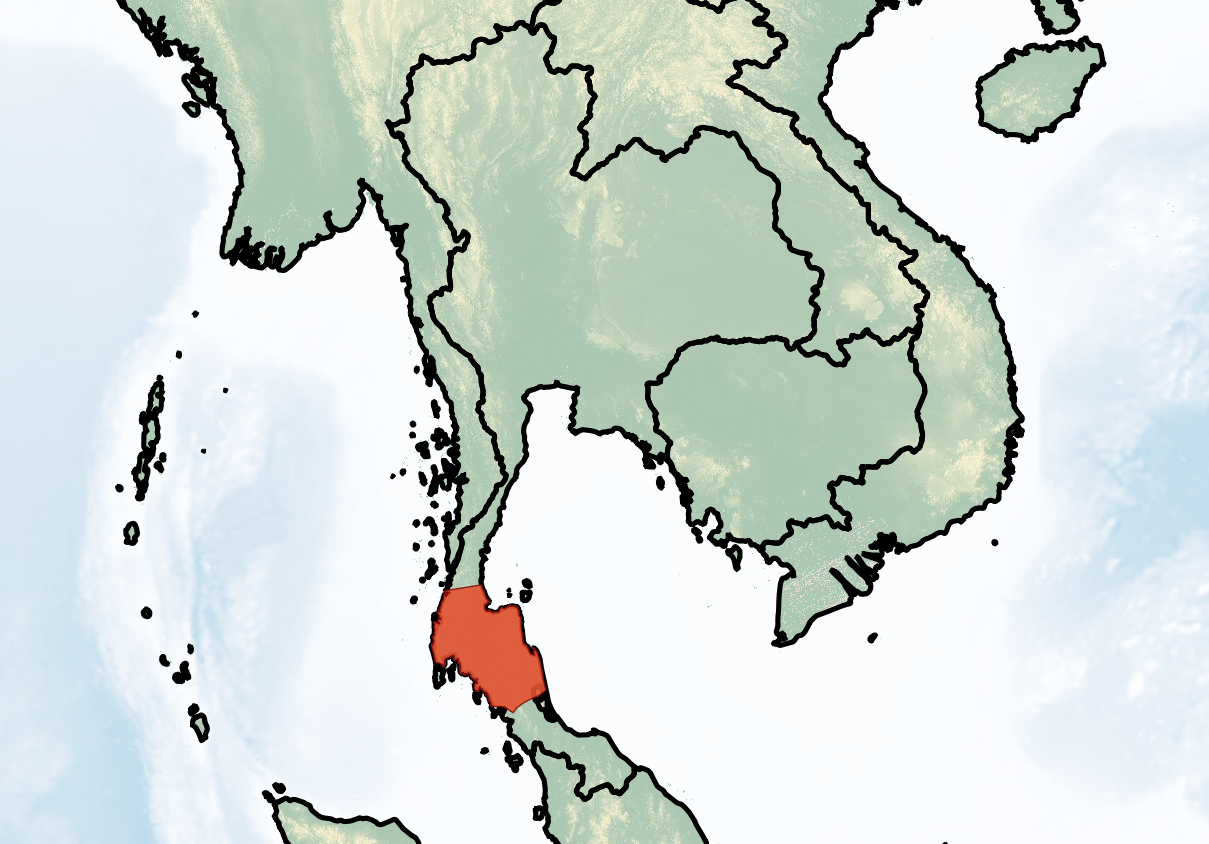

= Hipposideros pendleburyi =

Species of bat

Pendlebury's roundleaf bat (Hipposideros pendleburyi) is a species of bat in the family Hipposideridae. It was previously considered a subspecies of H. turpis, but has now been raised to full species level. It is endemic to Thailand and is found in limestone karst areas.

It is a large bat, with a forearm length of 75–81 mm (3.0–3.2 in) and a weight of 24–40 g (0.85–1.41 oz).

== Taxonomy ==
It was previously considered a subspecies of H. turpis, along with H. alongensis, but has now been raised to full species level.

== Description ==
The bat is large, with dark brown fur. The anterior nose leaf does not cover the muzzle, and it has 4 lateral leaflets, with the outer one being very small. The posterior nose leaf is thickened and narrower than the median nose leaf with weak swellings behind it.

It has a forearm length of 75–81 mm (3.0–3.2 in) and a weight of 24–40 g (0.85–1.41 oz).

== Biology ==
=== Echolocation ===
The echolocation frequency of this species is 85–88 kHz.

== Habitat and distribution ==
The species is found in the Chumphon, Surat Thani, Nakhon Sithammarat, Phang Nga, Krabi, Trang and Phattalung provinces of Thailand. It roosts in limestone caves with colonies of 3–800 individuals. It was also observed sharing caves with other bat species such as Hipposideros armiger, H. larvatus, H. diadema, Megaderma lyra, and Eonycteris spelaea.

== Conservation ==
The bat is assessed as vulnerable by the IUCN. It is estimated to have a total population of 4,700 individuals, with colonies varying from 3-800 individuals. The population is fragmented across 14 caves. The population is in continuing decline, mostly due to habitat disturbance.

The species is on the national list of protected fauna, however, most of the species roosts lie outside a protected area.

The species roosts in limestone caves surrounded by rubber, oil palm plantations, or temples and villages. The roosts face disturbance from limestone quarrying and other human activity.
