= Hipposideros kunzi =

Scientific classification
- Kingdom: Animalia
- Phylum: Chordata
- Class: Mammalia
- Order: Chiroptera
- Family: Hipposideridae
- Genus: Hipposideros
- Species: H. kunzi

Binomial name
- Hipposideros kunzi Murray, Khan, Kingston, Zubaid & Campbell, 2018

Species of bat

Hipposideros kunzi is a species of bat in the family Hipposideridae. First described in 2018, it was named after Thomas Kunz in honor of his work on bat research and conservation. It is known from Peninsular Malaysia and the nearby southern tip of Thailand.

Populations of Hipposideros kunzi were previously assigned to Hipposideros bicolor, and the species is closely related to H. bicolor and other similar species, such as Hipposideros kingstonae. With an average forearm length of 42.9 millimetres (1.69 in), H. kunzi is a relatively small member of the H. bicolor group. The fur on the back is brown to orange, and that on the belly is yellow-brown to golden. The bat echolocates at an average frequency of 143.1 kHz. Compared to H. bicolor, it is slightly smaller, uses a higher echolocation frequency, and differs in details of the noseleaf structure. Compared to H. kingstonae, it is smaller and differs in the shape of the internarial septum, a structure in the noseleaf. However, the two species overlap in echolocation frequency.
