= Nicobar leaf-nosed bat =

Conservation status
- Endangered (IUCN 3.1)

Scientific classification
- Kingdom: Animalia
- Phylum: Chordata
- Class: Mammalia
- Order: Chiroptera
- Family: Hipposideridae
- Genus: Macronycteris
- Species: H. nicobarulae

Binomial name
- Hipposideros nicobarulae Miller, 1902

Species of bat

The Nicobar leaf-nosed bat (Hipposideros nicobarulae) is an endangered species of bat endemic to the Nicobar Islands.

== Taxonomy ==
The Nicobar leaf-nosed bat was described as a new species in 1902 by Gerrit Smith Miller Jr. The holotype had been collected on Little Nicobar island in 1901 by William Louis Abbott. In later publications, it was considered a subspecies of the dusky leaf-nosed bat (Hipposideros ater). In 1997, one publication highlighted the significant morphological differences between the Nicobar leaf-nosed bat and the dusky leaf-nosed bat, though still considered the former a subspecies of the latter. A 2011 study expanded on these morphological differences and the authors determined they were significant enough to consider the Nicobar leaf-nosed bat a full species.

== Description ==
In comparison to the dusky leaf-nosed bat, the Nicobar leaf-nosed bat is larger. Its forearm length is about 40.2 mm (1.58 in), with a head and body length of 44.3 mm (1.74 in). It has a relatively small nose-leaf that lacks lateral leaflets.

== Range and habitat ==
The Nicobar leaf-nosed bat is endemic to the Nicobar Islands, where it has been documented on eleven islands. Its habitat includes lowland tropical rainforests. At night, it roosts in caves or abandoned buildings.

== Conservation ==
The Nicobar leaf-nosed bat is listed as an endangered species largely due to its restricted geographic range. Because it is only found on the Nicobar islands, it is highly vulnerable to local disturbances such as deforestation, cyclones, or tsunamis. Other threats to the species include cave disturbance due to edible-nest swiftlet nest poaching.
