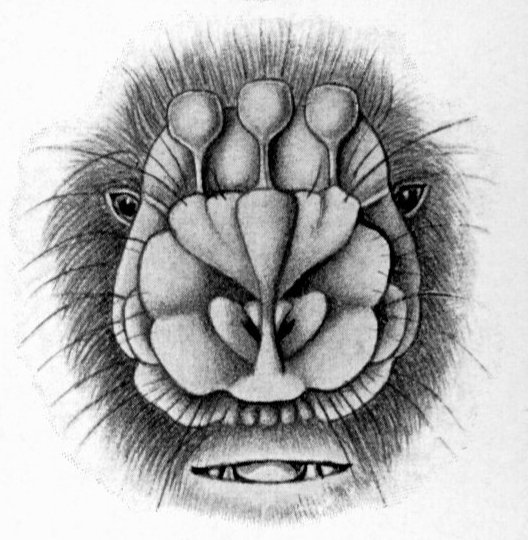
- The bat's face, depicted by Ernst Haeckel

Conservation status
- Vulnerable (IUCN 3.1)

Scientific classification
- Kingdom: Animalia
- Phylum: Chordata
- Class: Mammalia
- Order: Chiroptera
- Family: Hipposideridae
- Genus: Anthops; Thomas, 1888
- Species: A. ornatus

Binomial name
- Anthops ornatus Thomas, 1888
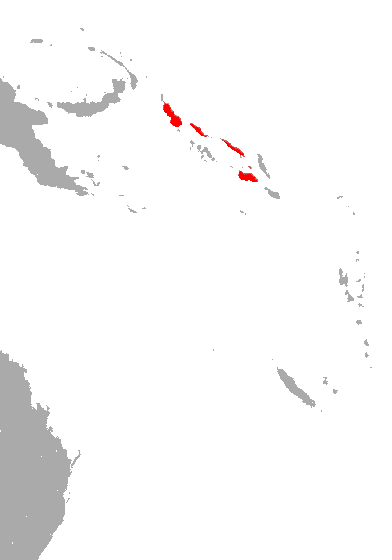
- Flower-faced bat range

= Flower-faced bat =

Species of bat

The flower-faced bat (Anthops ornatus) is a species of bat in the family Hipposideridae. It is in the monotypic genus Anthops. It is found in the Autonomous Region of Bougainville of Papua New Guinea and in the Solomon Islands. This rare and little-known bat has been recorded from tropical moist forest and flying around village houses.
