= Doryrhina =

Scientific classification
- Domain: Eukaryota
- Kingdom: Animalia
- Phylum: Chordata
- Class: Mammalia
- Order: Chiroptera
- Family: Hipposideridae
- Genus: Doryrhina; Peters, 1871

Genus of bats

Doryrhina is a genus of bats belonging to the family Hipposideridae. The best known species, Doryrhina cyclops, was long placed in the diverse genus Hipposideros, but a 2017 study found that it did not form a monophyletic group with true Hipposideros. Consequently, it was placed in a separate genus, Doryrhina. A second species, Doryrhina camerunensis, has not been studied genetically, but it is generally thought to be related to D. cyclops, so it was also moved to Doryrhina.

Both species are restricted to Africa, ranging from Senegal to Kenya.

Species:

- Doryrhina camerunensis (Eisentraut, 1956)
- Doryrhina cyclops (Temminck, 1853)
