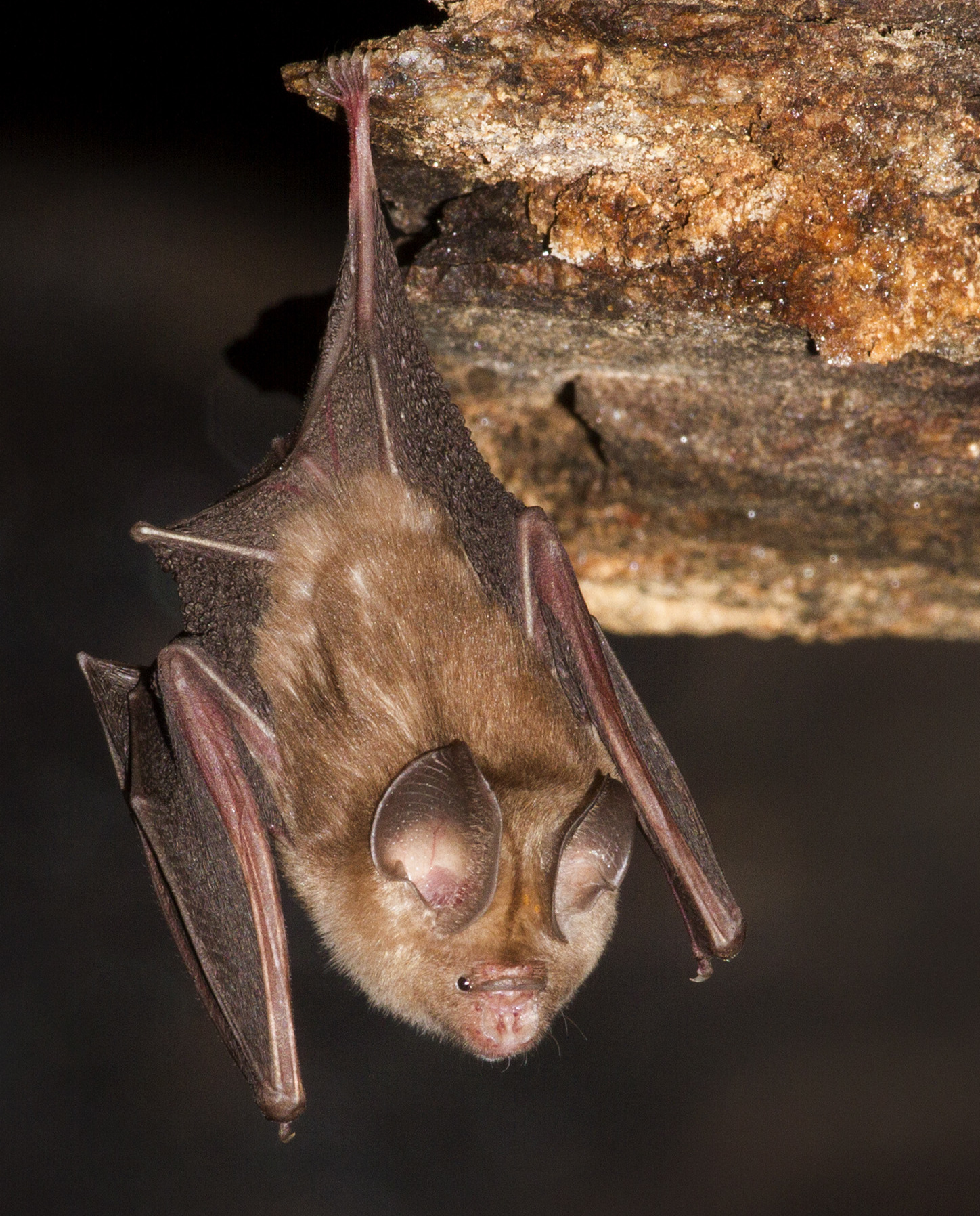

Conservation status
- Vulnerable (IUCN 3.1)

Scientific classification
- Kingdom: Animalia
- Phylum: Chordata
- Class: Mammalia
- Order: Chiroptera
- Family: Hipposideridae
- Genus: Hipposideros
- Species: H. durgadasi

Binomial name
- Hipposideros durgadasi Khajuria, 1970
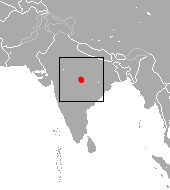
- Khajuria's leaf-nosed bat range

Synonyms
- Hipposideros cineraceus durgadasi

= Khajuria's leaf-nosed bat =

Species of bat found in India

Khajuria's leaf-nosed bat (Hipposideros durgadasi), also known as Durga Das's leaf-nosed bat, is a species of bat in the family Hipposideridae. It is endemic to India. Its natural habitat is caves. It is threatened by habitat loss.

== Taxonomy ==
The bat was formerly considered a subspecies of H. cineraceus by Blyth in 1853, but is now commonly considered a distinct species. The species was first recognized as a separate species by Topál in 1975. It belongs to the bicolor species group.

The holotype was collected from the Jabalpur district of Madhya Pradesh in 1970.

== Description ==
The fur is soft and brown to reddish-brown on the dorsal surface and whitish on the ventral surface. The bat, like other species in the bicolor group, lacks supplementary leaflets. The anterior leaf possesses a median emargination and is covered everywhere with short, stiff black hair. The internarial septum is well-developed and has a short base and a bulbous apex. The nostrils are oval in shape and they possess narial lappets on the outer margin.

The tail of the bat projects beyond the interfemoral membrane, and the baculum is 1.3mm long, with a C- shape. The presence of a well-developed internarial septum of peculiar shape (with a short base and a bulbous apex), the fact that the tail projects beyond the interfemoral membrane, and the conspicuous C-shape of the baculum are some of the characters of H. durgadasi which render this species distinct from its sister species.

== Biology ==
=== Diet ===
The bat feeds on beetles, crickets, and other small insects.

=== Echolocation ===
The bat echolocates at a frequency of 168.4–175.7 kHz. This is a much higher frequency than H. cineraceus, despite the bat being larger than the latter species.

== Habitat and distribution ==
The bat is endemic to India and known from the villages of Katangi, Katanga and Richhai in the district of Jabalpur in Madhya Pradesh and the villages of Hanumanahalli and Therahalli in the Kolar district of Karnataka. In 1998, a team from the Zoological Survey of India also found 9 individuals in a roost site in Loyudhan Falls in the Mirzapur district of Uttar Pradesh.

However, specimens of H. durgadasi have not been spotted in the original type locality for almost 30 years.

The bat's known range extends over 114,335 km^{2}, however, the bat only occupies around 2,000 km^{2} of that. It inhabits areas from 347 to 900 m above sea level.

The bat roosts in colonies of several individuals in cave systems and is also found roosting below large granite boulders and in caves. It has been observed roosting with other species of bat, but has also been found to roost purely with members of its own species in a cave.

The bat mainly forages in dry tropical deciduous forest and tropical thorn forest.

== Conservation ==
The bat is listed as vulnerable by the IUCN because of its limited area of occupancy, its scattered and limited population, the continuing decrease in its population, and continuing degradation of its habitat.

The main threat to the bat is that of habitat loss caused by stone quarrying operations. The roosting caves in the Kolar district are especially threatened due to illegal granite mining, which occurs only a couple hundred feet away from the bat's roosts. The bat may also face threats from general roost disturbance.

The bat is not protected by any legal bill or agreement, and the habitat of the bat does not overlap with any protected areas. However, further studies are need to ascertain the true range of this species, as some populations may be confused with populations of H. cineraceus, H. ater and ater like taxa.
