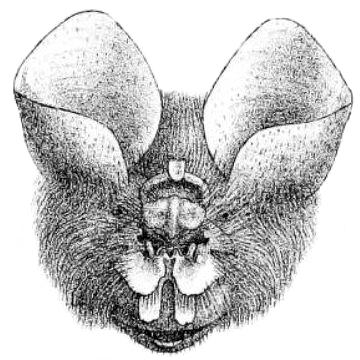

Conservation status
- Near Threatened (IUCN 3.1)

Scientific classification
- Kingdom: Animalia
- Phylum: Chordata
- Class: Mammalia
- Order: Chiroptera
- Family: Hipposideridae
- Genus: Coelops
- Species: C. frithii

Binomial name
- Coelops frithii Blyth, 1848
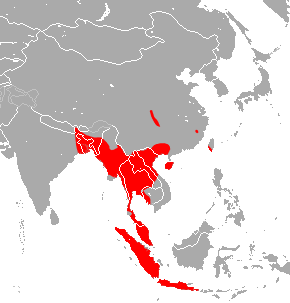
- East Asian tailless leaf-nosed bat range

= East Asian tailless leaf-nosed bat =

Species of bat

The East Asian tailless leaf-nosed bat or tail-less leaf-nosed bat (Coelops frithii) is a species of bat in the family Hipposideridae. It is found in Bangladesh, China, India, Indonesia, Laos, Malaysia, Myanmar, Taiwan, and Vietnam.

The species name commemorates the collector R.W.G. Frith.
