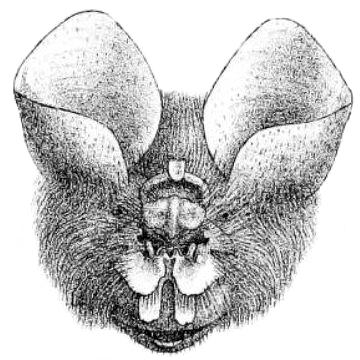
- Coelops frithii

Scientific classification
- Domain: Eukaryota
- Kingdom: Animalia
- Phylum: Chordata
- Class: Mammalia
- Order: Chiroptera
- Family: Hipposideridae
- Genus: Coelops; Blyth, 1848

Type species
- Coelops frithii Blyth, 1848

Species
- See text

= Coelops =

Genus of bats

Coelops is a genus of bat in the family Hipposideridae. It contains the following species:

- East Asian tailless leaf-nosed bat (Coelops frithii)
- Malayan tailless leaf-nosed bat (Coelops robinsoni)
