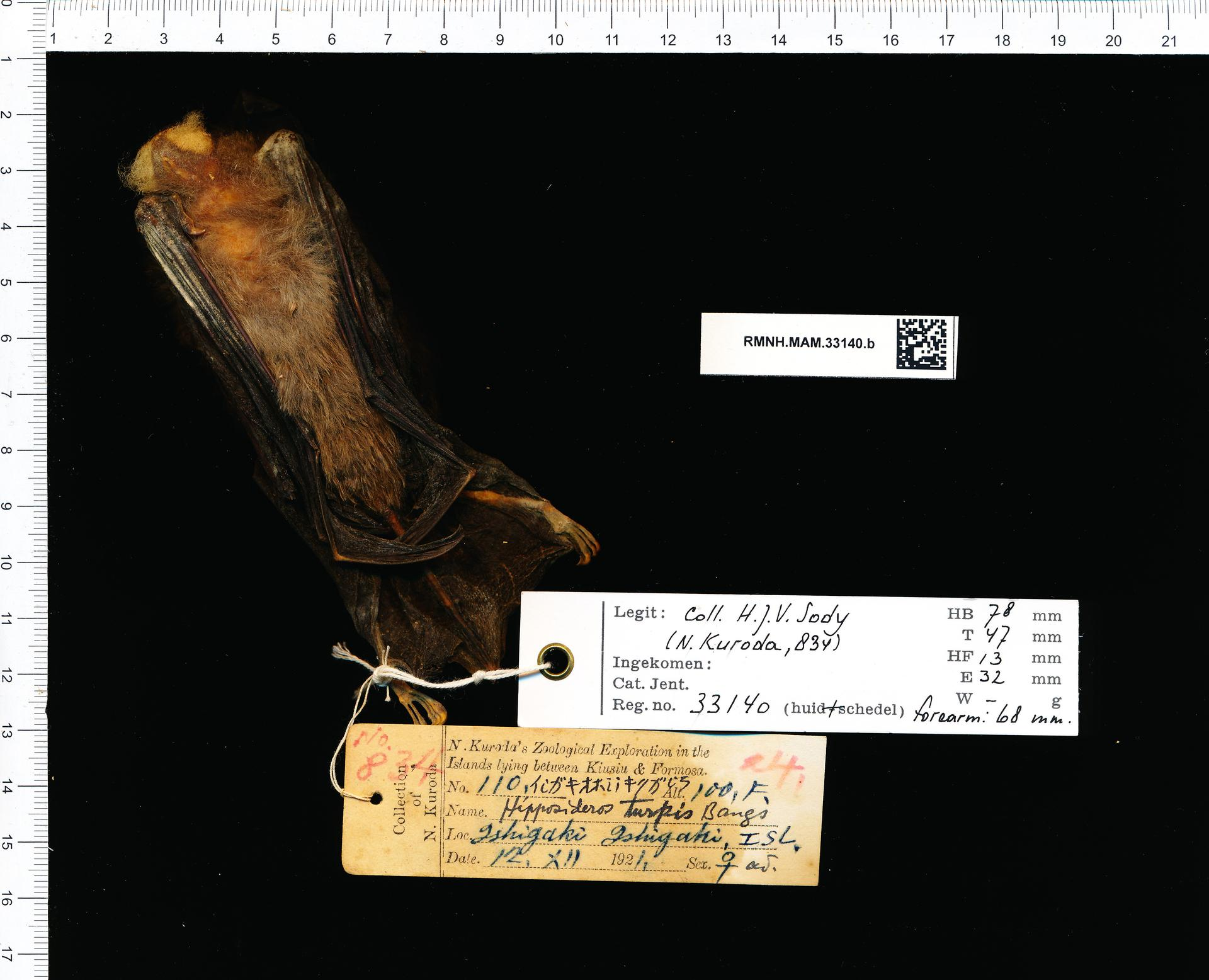

Conservation status
- Endangered (IUCN 3.1)

Scientific classification
- Kingdom: Animalia
- Phylum: Chordata
- Class: Mammalia
- Order: Chiroptera
- Family: Hipposideridae
- Genus: Hipposideros
- Species: H. turpis

Binomial name
- Hipposideros turpis Bangs, 1901

= Lesser great leaf-nosed bat =

Species of bat

The lesser great leaf-nosed bat or lesser roundleaf bat (Hipposideros turpis) is a species of bat in the family Hipposideridae. It is found in Japan. Its natural habitat is temperate forests. Human interference has caused rapid habitat destruction, this has caused the bat to become endangered.

== Subspecies ==
Previously three subspecies was included:

- H. t. turpis: Yaeyama Islands, Japan, on the 4 islands Iriomote, Ishigaki, Yonaguni, and Hateruma.
- H. t. pendleuryi: Thailand
- H. t. alongensis: Vietnam

Two subspecies of Thailand and Vietnam are considered to be distinct species, H. pendleuryi and H. alongensis, respectively.
