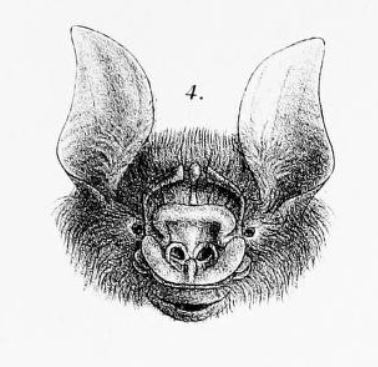
- Aselliscus tricuspidatus illustrated by George Edward Dobson

Scientific classification
- Kingdom: Animalia
- Phylum: Chordata
- Class: Mammalia
- Order: Chiroptera
- Family: Hipposideridae
- Genus: Aselliscus; Tate, 1941

Type species
- Rhinolophus tricuspidatus Temminck, 1835.

= Aselliscus =

Genus of bats

Aselliscus is a genus of bat in the family Hipposideridae. As of 2015, it contains the following species:

- Dong Bac's trident bat (Aselliscus dongbacana)
- Stoliczka's trident bat (Aselliscus stoliczkanus)
- Temminck's trident bat (Aselliscus tricuspidatus)
