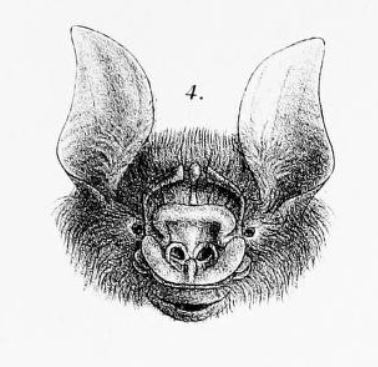

Conservation status
- Least Concern (IUCN 3.1)

Scientific classification
- Kingdom: Animalia
- Phylum: Chordata
- Class: Mammalia
- Order: Chiroptera
- Family: Hipposideridae
- Genus: Aselliscus
- Species: A. tricuspidatus

Binomial name
- Aselliscus tricuspidatus (Temminck, 1835)
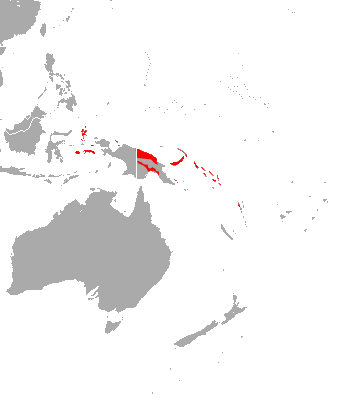
- Temminck's trident bat range

= Temminck's trident bat =

Species of bat

Temminck's trident bat (Aselliscus tricuspidatus) is a species of bat in the family Hipposideridae. It is found in Indonesia, Papua New Guinea, the Solomon Islands, and Vanuatu.
