= Greater roundleaf bat =

Conservation status
- Data Deficient (IUCN 3.1)

Scientific classification
- Kingdom: Animalia
- Phylum: Chordata
- Class: Mammalia
- Order: Chiroptera
- Family: Hipposideridae
- Genus: Doryrhina
- Species: D. camerunensis

Binomial name
- Doryrhina camerunensis Eisentraut, 1956
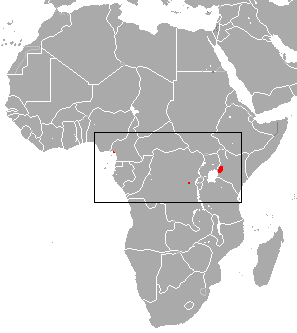
- Greater roundleaf bat range

Species of bat

The greater roundleaf bat (Doryrhina camerunensis) is a species of bat in the family Hipposideridae found in Cameroon, the Democratic Republic of the Congo, and Kenya. Previously placed in Hipposideros, it was transferred to Doryrhina because it is assumed to be closely related to the cyclops roundleaf bat (Doryrhina cyclops).
