= Cox's roundleaf bat =

Conservation status
- Endangered (IUCN 3.1)

Scientific classification
- Kingdom: Animalia
- Phylum: Chordata
- Class: Mammalia
- Order: Chiroptera
- Family: Hipposideridae
- Genus: Hipposideros
- Species: H. coxi

Binomial name
- Hipposideros coxi Shelford, 1901
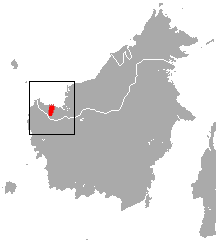
- Cox's Roundleaf Bat range

Species of bat

Cox's roundleaf bat or Cox's leaf-nosed bat (Hipposideros coxi) is a species of bat in the family Hipposideridae. It is endemic to Borneo. All confirmed records are from Sarawak (Malaysia), but it might also occur in Kalimantan (Indonesia).

== Taxonomy ==
Cox's roundleaf bat was described as a new species in 1901 by British naturalist Robert W. C. Shelford. The holotype had been collected in Mount Penrisen in the Malaysian state of Sarawak, which is on the island of Borneo. It had been collected by E. A. W. Cox, whom Shelford honored with the eponym coxi.

== Description ==
Cox's roundleaf bat is considered a medium-sized member of its genus. It can be differentiated from other hipposiderids in Borneo by its particularly large noseleaf, which entirely covers the muzzle. Its ears are also large. The ears, noseleaf, wings, and back are all dark brown, with its belly fur somewhat paler. The forearm measures 50.6–56 mm (1.99–2.20 in) and individuals weigh 8.0–10.2 g (0.28–0.36 oz).

== Biology and ecology ==
During the day, it roosts in caves in small colonies of typically twenty or fewer individuals. It is insectivorous, consuming at least seven different orders of insects: Coleoptera, Diptera, Hemiptera, Hymenoptera, Lepidoptera, Odonata, and Trichoptera.

== Range and habitat ==
Cox's roundleaf bat is endemic to Malaysia and has only been documented on the island of Borneo.

== Conservation ==
As of 2016, it is evaluated as an endangered species by the International Union for Conservation of Nature. It meets the criteria for this designation due to its small area of occupancy, measuring less than 500 km^{2} (190 mi^{2}). Its suitable habitat is highly fragmented and likely declining in quality and extent. It is threatened by cave disturbance, including humans entering caves to harvest the nests of the edible-nest swiftlet, as well as mining and quarrying.
