= Sorensen's leaf-nosed bat =

Conservation status
- Endangered (IUCN 3.1)

Scientific classification
- Kingdom: Animalia
- Phylum: Chordata
- Class: Mammalia
- Order: Chiroptera
- Family: Hipposideridae
- Genus: Hipposideros
- Species: H. sorenseni

Binomial name
- Hipposideros sorenseni Kitchener & Maryanto, 1993
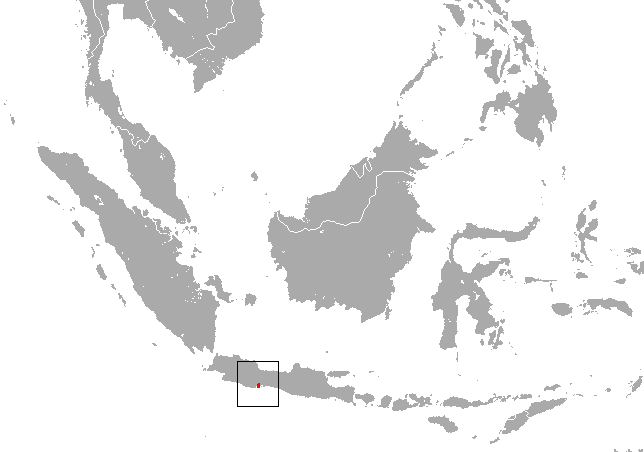
- Sorensen's leaf-nosed bat range

Species of bat

Sorensen's leaf-nosed bat (Hipposideros sorenseni) is a species of bat in the family Hipposideridae that is endemic to Indonesia.

== Taxonomy ==
Sorensen's leaf-nosed bat was described as a new species in 1993 by Darrell Kitchener and I. Maryanto. The holotype had been collected in 1976 by Bapak Sudarmanu in Gua Kramat near the town of Pangandaran in West Java. The eponym for the species name "sorenseni" is Kurt Sorensen for his support of the Western Australian Museum and Bogor Zoology Museum's research in Indonesia.

== Description ==
Sorensen's leaf-nosed bat has a forearm length of 55.41–60.22 mm (2.181–2.371 in) and an ear length of 20.16–22.78 mm (0.794–0.897 in). It is highly colonial, roosting in caves in large aggregations.

== Range and status ==
Sorensen's leaf-nosed bat is endemic to the Indonesian island of Java, where it has been documented at a range of elevations from 0–1,000 m (0–3,281 ft) above sea level. During the day it roosts in caves. As of 2021, Sorensen's leaf-nosed bat was evaluated as an endangered species by the IUCN.Its cave roosts are protected, but if disturbance were to occur, its populations could rapidly decline, becoming critically endangered or extinct. Possible threats to this species include mining for limestone.
