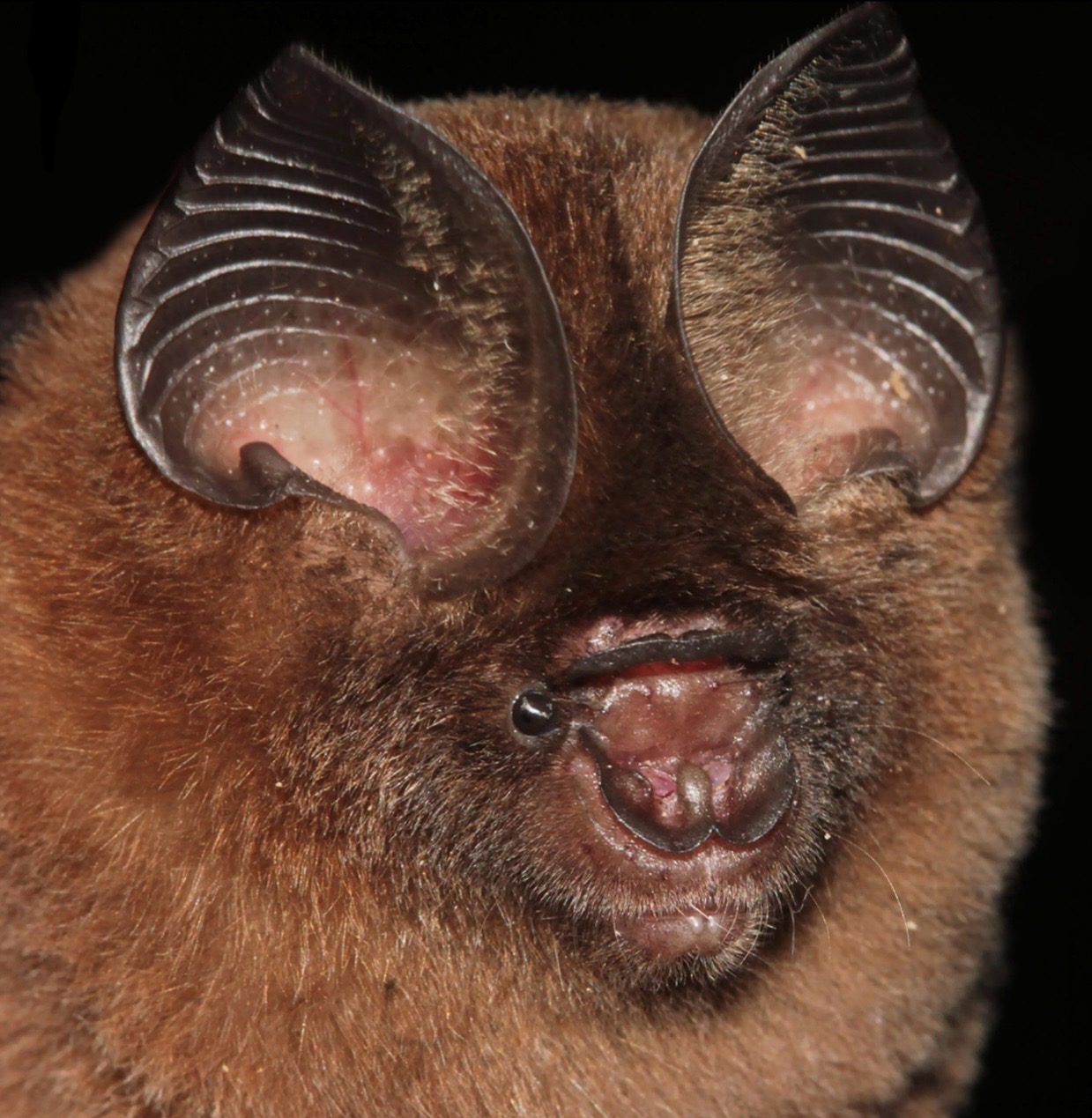

Scientific classification
- Kingdom: Animalia
- Phylum: Chordata
- Class: Mammalia
- Order: Chiroptera
- Family: Hipposideridae
- Genus: Hipposideros
- Species: H. kingstonae

Binomial name
- Hipposideros kingstonae Wongwaiyut, Karapan, Saekong, Francis, Guillén-Servent, Senawi, Khan, Bates, Jantarit & Soisook, 2023

= Hipposideros kingstonae =

Species of bat

Hipposideros kingstonae is a species of bat in the family Hipposideridae. First described in 2023, it was named after Tigga Kingston in honor of her work for bat conversation in Southeast Asia. It is securely known from far southern Thailand, Peninsular Malaysia, and Sabah in northern Borneo. However, it is likely more widespread on Borneo and may also occur on the nearby island of Palawan in the Philippines. Based on mitochondrial DNA data, the species is most closely related to Hipposideros bicolor and Hipposideros kunzi. However, morphologically it resembles another closely related species, Hipposideros einnaythu from Myanmar. However, H. einnaythu is slightly larger and differs in details of the noseleaf and baculum.

== Anatomy ==
Hipposideros kingstonae can be distinguished from other Hipposideros by differences in external, bacular, and craniodental morphology, as well as their echolocation call frequency, which is, at maximum, 132.3–144.0 kHz, varying in those found in Borneo and those found in the Thai-Malaysian area. Those found in the Thai-Malay habitats have a range of 141.0 - 144.0 kHz, however those in Borneo are 132.3-141.4 kHz. Like their other nose-leafed-bat counterparts, they have a particular rounded swelling on the inside of their nose. Their forearms lengths are 35.3–42.6 mm (1.39–1.68 in), and their skull lengths are 14.94–17.90 mm (0.588–0.705 in). They are genetically similar to Hipposideros einnaythu, also found in Thailand.

== Range and habitat ==
The species is only found in five main locations across Southeastern Asia; two forests in Thailand – Hala Forest in Yala Province, and Phru To Daeng Swamp Forest in Narathiwat Province – one from Malaysia at Krau Wildlife Reserve in Pahang, and two in Sabah, Borneo at Madai Caves and Gunung Kinabalu. It is possible that H. kingstonae was mistakenly documented as the H. cineraceus; if so, the bat has been seen in lowland rainforests, furthermore, its highest recorded elevation has been 1,800 m (5,900 ft) above sea level. Though, its true roosting sites are unknown, as well as the species’ geographic distribution across Southeastern Asia.

== Etymology ==
The bat's named in recognition of its discoverer, Tigga Kingston, who is the founder and chair of the Southeast Asian Bat Conservation Research Unit (SEABCRU).

== See also ==
- List of living mammal species described in the 2020s
