= Makira roundleaf bat =

Conservation status
- Endangered (IUCN 3.1)

Scientific classification
- Kingdom: Animalia
- Phylum: Chordata
- Class: Mammalia
- Order: Chiroptera
- Family: Hipposideridae
- Genus: Macronycteris
- Species: H. demissus

Binomial name
- Hipposideros demissus Andersen, 1909
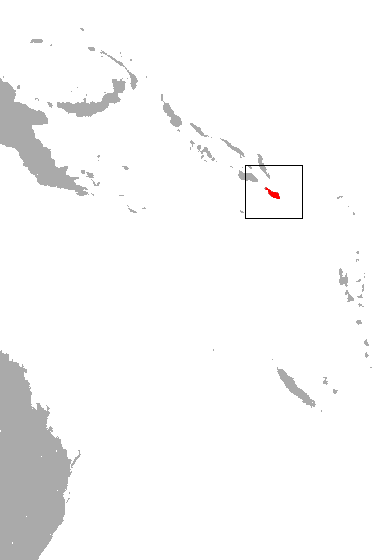

Synonyms
- Hipposideros diadema demissus Andersen, 1909

Species of bat

The Makira roundleaf bat or Makira leaf-nosed bat (Hipposideros demissus) is a species of bat in the family Hipposideridae endemic to the Solomon Islands.

== Taxonomy ==
The Makira roundleaf bat was described as a new species in 1909 by Danish mammalogist Knud Andersen. The holotype had been collected by English naturalist Albert Stewart Meek in 1908. In the past, it has been considered a subspecies of the diadem leaf-nosed bat (H. diadema), though is largely considered a full species as of 2019.

== Description ==
Individuals have a forearm length of approximately 67 mm (2.6 in). The fur of its back is dark brown, with individual hairs tricolored: hairs are dark brown at the base, light- or whitish-brown in the middle, and dark brown again at the tips. There are two stripes of lighter fur on its back, running along the flight membranes. Its belly fur is more drab in color.

== Range and habitat ==
The Makira roundleaf bat is endemic to the island of Makira, which is part of the Solomon Islands. Its roosting habitat includes caves and other subterranean areas.

== Conservation ==
It is considered endangered by the IUCN. It meets the criteria for this designation because it is known from fewer than five locations on a single island. The island regularly experiences disturbances such as cyclones, which could negatively impact this species.
