= Stoliczka's trident bat =

Conservation status
- Least Concern (IUCN 3.1)

Scientific classification
- Kingdom: Animalia
- Phylum: Chordata
- Class: Mammalia
- Order: Chiroptera
- Family: Hipposideridae
- Genus: Aselliscus
- Species: A. stoliczkanus

Binomial name
- Aselliscus stoliczkanus (Dobson, 1871)
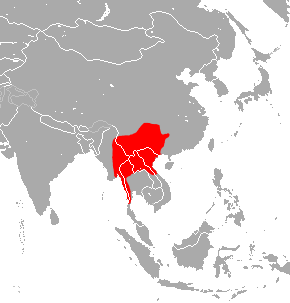
- Stoliczka's trident bat range

Synonyms
- Asellia stoliczkanus Dobson, 1871; Phyllorhina stoliczkanus Dobson, 1871; Phyllorhina trifida Peters, 1871; Triaenops wheeleri Osgood, 1932

Species of bat

Stoliczka's trident bat (Aselliscus stoliczkanus) is a species of bat in the family Hipposideridae. It is found in China, Laos, Malaysia, Myanmar, Thailand, and Vietnam.

== Taxonomy ==
Stoliczka's trident bat was described as a new species in 1871 by George Edward Dobson. The holotype had been collected by Ferdinand Stoliczka on Penang Island, Malaysia. Dobson placed it in the genus Asellia, with a scientific name of Asellia stoliczkanus. In 1952, Colin Campbell Sanborn published a revision of the species, in which he considered multiple other names as synonymous, including Phyllorhina trifida and Triaenops wheeleri. Additionally, he revised its genus, moving it from Asellia to Aselliscus.

== Description ==
Stoliczka's trident bat is a small bat with a head and body length of 40–50 mm (1.6–2.0 in), a forearm length of 39–44 mm (1.5–1.7 in), and a tail length of 30–40 mm (1.2–1.6 in). The hairs on its back are bicolored, with the bases nearly white and the tips brown. The fur on the belly is paler in color. Its nose-leaf has three points on the upper edge, with two smaller leaflets on each side.

== Range and habitat ==
Stoliczka's trident bat has a wide range in Asia, and can be found in China, Laos, Malaysia, Myanmar, Thailand, and Vietnam. It is found at a range of elevations from 20–2,100 m (66–6,890 ft) above sea level. It is found in lowland subtropical and tropical forests.
