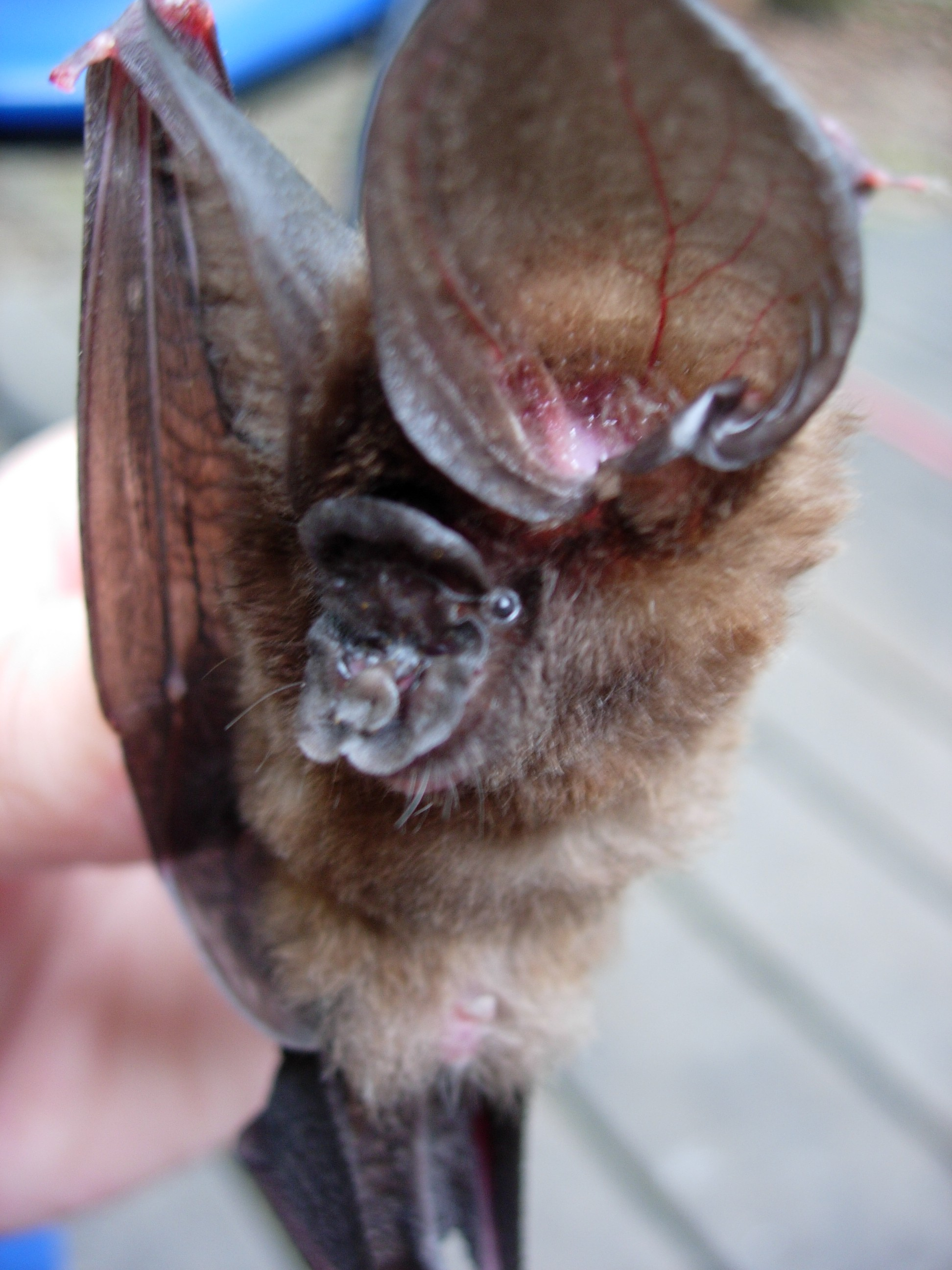

Conservation status
- Vulnerable (IUCN 3.1)

Scientific classification
- Kingdom: Animalia
- Phylum: Chordata
- Class: Mammalia
- Order: Chiroptera
- Family: Hipposideridae
- Genus: Hipposideros
- Species: H. ridleyi

Binomial name
- Hipposideros ridleyi Robinson & Kloss, 1911
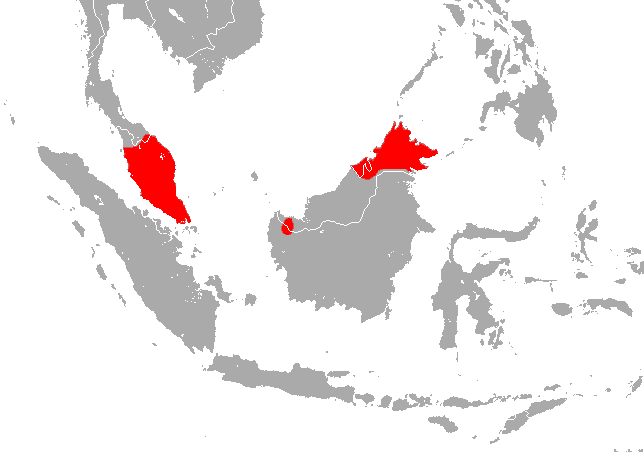
- Ridley's leaf-nosed bat range

= Ridley's leaf-nosed bat =

Species of bat

Ridley's leaf-nosed bat, Ridley's roundleaf bat, or Singapore roundleaf horseshoe bat (Hipposideros ridleyi) is a species of bat in the family Hipposideridae. It is found in Brunei, Malaysia and Singapore. Its natural habitat is subtropical or tropical swamps. It is threatened by habitat loss.

== Taxonomy ==
Ridley's leaf-nosed bat was described as a new species in 1911 by Herbert Christopher Robinson and C. Boden Kloss. The holotype had been collected by English botanist Henry Nicholas Ridley in the Singapore Botanic Gardens in 1911.

== Description ==
Ridley's leaf-nosed bat has a forearm length of 47–51 mm (1.9–2.0 in). Its nose-leaf is very large and dark, covering its muzzle. The nose-leaf lacks lateral leaflets (smaller projections to the side).

== Range and status ==
It is found in Southeast Asia where it has been documented in Brunei, Malaysia, and Singapore. It is found at a range of elevations from 0–500 m (0–1,640 ft) above sea level. Its habitat is lowland old-growth forest. Possibly, its range also includes Indonesia. As of 2020, it is evaluated as a vulnerable species by the IUCN.
