= List of mammals of Thailand =

This is a list of the mammal species recorded in Thailand.

== Order: Artiodactyla (even-toed ungulates and cetaceans) ==
| Image | Common name | Scientific name Authority | Preferred habitat | IUCN status | Range |
|---|---|---|---|---|---|
Family Suidae: pigs
| | Wild boar | Sus scrofa Linnaeus, 1758 | Wide variety of habitats | LC^{IUCN} Unknown | |
Family Tragulidae: mouse-deer
| | Lesser mouse-deer | Tragulus kanchil Raffles, 1821 | Lowland forests | LC^{IUCN} Unknown | |
| | Greater mouse-deer | Tragulus napu F. Cuvier, 1822 | Lowland forests | LC^{IUCN} Unknown | |
| | Williamson's mouse-deer | Tragulus williamsoni Kloss, 1916 | Forest | DD^{IUCN} ▼ | |
Family Cervidae: deer
| | Indian hog deer | Axis porcinus Zimmermann, 1780 | Moist tall grasslands | EN^{IUCN} ▼ | |
| | Sambar deer | Rusa unicolor Kerr, 1792 | Wide variety of forest & savanna | VU^{IUCN} ▼ | |
| | Indian muntjac | Muntiacus vaginalis Zimmermann, 1780 | Wide variety of forests & scrublands | LC^{IUCN} ▼ | |
| | Fea's muntjac | Muntiacus feae Kerr, 1792 | Evergreen forest | DD^{IUCN} Unknown | |
Family Bovidae: cattle, antelope, sheep, goats
| | Gaur | Bos gaurus Smith, 1827 | Forest, grassland, shrubland, & savanna | VU^{IUCN} ▼ | |
| | Banteng | Bos javanicus d'Alton, 1823 | Forest & grassland | EN^{IUCN} ▼ | |
| | Kouprey | Bos sauveli Urbain, 1937 | Extirpated; previously seen in dipterocarp forests with grasslands. No confirmations since 1970; possibly extinct. | CR, possibly EX ▼ | |
| | Wild water buffalo | Bubalus arnee Kerr, 1792 | Wetlands, grasslands, and riparian forests | EN^{IUCN} ▼ | |
| | Mainland serow | Capricornis sumatraensis Bechstein, 1799 | Forested mountain slopes | VU^{IUCN} ▼ | |
| | Chinese goral | Naemorhedus griseus A. Milne-Edwards, 1871 | | | |
Family Balaenopteridae: rorquals
| | Common minke whale | Balaenoptera acutorostrata Lacépède, 1804 | Neritic & oceanic marine zones | LC^{IUCN} Unknown | |
| | Sei whale | Balaenoptera borealis Lesson, 1828 | Neritic & oceanic marine zones | EN^{IUCN} ▲ | |
| | Bryde's whale | Balaenoptera edeni Anderson, 1879 | Neritic & oceanic marine zones | LC^{IUCN} Unknown | |
| | Blue whale | Balaenoptera musculus Linnaeus, 1758 | Neritic & oceanic marine zones | EN^{IUCN} ▲ | |
| | Omura's whale | Balaenoptera omurai Wada, Oishi & Yamada, 2003 | Neritic & oceanic marine zones | DD^{IUCN} Unknown | |
| | Fin whale | Balaenoptera physalus Linnaeus, 1758 | Neritic & oceanic marine zones | VU^{IUCN} ▲ | |
| | Humpback whale | Megaptera novaeangliae Borowski, 1781 | Neritic & oceanic marine zones | LC^{IUCN} ▲ | |
Family Phocoenidae: porpoises
| | Indo-Pacific finless porpoise | Neophocaena phocaenoides G. Cuvier, 1829 | Coastal waters | VU^{IUCN} ▼ | |
Family Physeteridae
| | Sperm whale | Physeter macrocephalus Linnaeus, 1758 | Neritic & oceanic marine zones | VU^{IUCN} Unknown | |
Family Delphinidae: marine dolphins
| | Pygmy killer whale | Feresa attenuata J. E. Gray, 1874 | Oceanic marine zone | LC^{IUCN} Unknown | |
| | Risso's dolphin | Grampus griseus G. Cuvier, 1812 | Oceanic marine zone | LC^{IUCN} Unknown | |
| | Fraser's dolphin | Lagenodelphis hosei Fraser, 1956 | Neritic & oceanic marine zones | LC^{IUCN} Unknown | |
| | Irrawaddy dolphin | Orcaella brevirostris Owen in Gray, 1866 | Coastal waters & rivers | EN^{IUCN} ▼ | |
| | Orca | Orcinus orca Linnaeus, 1758 | Neritic & oceanic marine zones | DD^{IUCN} Unknown | |
| | Indo-Pacific humpback dolphin | Sousa chinensis Osbeck, 1765 | Coastal waters | VU^{IUCN} ▼ | |
| | Pantropical spotted dolphin | Stenella attenuata Gray, 1846 | Neritic & oceanic marine zones | LC^{IUCN} Unknown | |
| | Spinner dolphin | Stenella longirostris Gray, 1828 | Neritic & oceanic marine zones | LC^{IUCN} Unknown | |
| | Rough-toothed dolphin | Steno bredanensis G. Cuvier in Lesson, 1828 | Neritic & oceanic marine zones | LC^{IUCN} Unknown | |
| | Indo-Pacific bottlenose dolphin | Tursiops aduncus Ehrenberg, 1833 | Neritic & oceanic marine zones | NT^{IUCN} Unknown | |
| | Common bottlenose dolphin | Tursiops truncatus Montagu, 1821 | Coastal, neritic & oceanic marine zones | LC^{IUCN} Unknown | |

== Order: Carnivora (felids, canids, and allies) ==
| Image | Common name | Scientific name Authority | Preferred habitat | IUCN status | Range |
|---|---|---|---|---|---|
Family Felidae: cats
| | Asian golden cat | Catopuma temminckii Vigors & Horsfield, 1827 | Forest, savanna, shrubland, & grassland | NT^{IUCN} ▼ | |
| | Jungle cat | Felis chaus Schreber, 1777 | Particularly around wetlands | LC^{IUCN} ▼ | |
| | Clouded leopard | Neofelis nebulosa Griffith, 1821 | Forest & shrubland | VU^{IUCN} ▼ | |
| | Leopard | Panthera pardus Linnaeus, 1758 | Wide range of habitats | VU^{IUCN} ▼ | |
| | Tiger | Panthera tigris Linnaeus, 1758 | Generalists but especially forests | EN^{IUCN} ▼ | |
| | Marbled cat | Pardofelis marmorata Martin, 1836 | Forest | NT^{IUCN} ▼ | |
| | Leopard cat | Prionailurus bengalensis Kerr, 1792 | Forest, shrublands, & grasslands | LC^{IUCN} | |
| | Flat-headed cat | Prionailurus planiceps Vigors & Horsfield, 1827 | Lowland forest & wetlands; possibly extirpated | EN^{IUCN} ▼ | |
| | Fishing cat | Prionailurus viverrinus Bennett, 1833 | Marshlands & near waterbodies | VU^{IUCN} ▼ | |
Family Viverridae
| | Binturong | Arctictis binturong Raffles, 1822 | Forest (arboreal) | VU^{IUCN} ▼ | |
| | Small-toothed palm civet | Arctogalidia trivirgata Gray, 1832 | Evergreen & semi-evergreen forest | LC^{IUCN} ▼ | |
| | Banded palm civet | Hemigalus derbyanus Gray, 1837 | Forest | NT^{IUCN} ▼ | |
| | Masked palm civet | Paguma larvata Smith, 1827 | Mainly evergreen and semi-evergreen forest | LC^{IUCN} ▼ | |
| | Asian palm civet | Paradoxurus hermaphroditus Pallas, 1777 | Wide range of forest, plantation, and urban environments | LC^{IUCN} ▼ | |
| | Large-spotted civet | Viverra megaspila Blyth, 1862 | Lowland forest | EN^{IUCN} ▼ | |
| | Large Indian civet | Viverra zibetha Linnaeus, 1758 | Forests & shrublands | LC^{IUCN} ▼ | |
| | Small Indian civet | Viverricula indica Geoffroy Saint-Hilaire, 1803 | Wide range of forests & wetlands | LC^{IUCN} | |
| | Otter civet | Cynogale bennettii Gray, 1836 | Lowland forest | EN^{IUCN} ▼ | |
Family Prionodontidae: linsangs
| | Banded linsang | Prionodon linsang Hardwicke, 1821 | Evergreen forest | LC^{IUCN} ▼ | |
| | Spotted linsang | Prionodon pardicolor Hodgson, 1842 | Forest, shrubland, and grassland | LC^{IUCN} ▼ | |
Family Herpestidae: mongooses
| | Javan mongoose | Urva javanica É. Geoffroy Saint-Hilaire, 1818 | Widespread in lowlands, including anthropogenic habitats | LC^{IUCN} Unknown | |
| | Crab-eating Mongoose | Urva urva Hodgson, 1836 | Widespread | LC^{IUCN} ▼ | |
Family Canidae: dogs, foxes
| | Dhole | Cuon alpinus Pallas, 1811 | Forest, shrubland, & grassland | EN^{IUCN} ▼ | |
| | Golden jackal | Canis aureus Linnaeus, 1758 | Wide variety, especially lowland deciduous dipterocarp forest | LC^{IUCN} ▲ | |
Family Ursidae: bears
| | Sun bear | Helarctos malayanus Raffles, 1821 | Forest & shrubland | VU^{IUCN} ▼ | |
| | Asian black bear | Ursus thibetanus G. Cuvier, 1823 | Forest & shrubland | VU^{IUCN} ▼ | |
Family Mustelidae: mustelids
| | Yellow-throated marten | Martes flavigula Boddaert, 1785 | Forests & shrublands | LC^{IUCN} ▼ | |
| | Yellow-bellied weasel | Mustela kathiah Hodgson, 1835 | Rugged highlands | LC^{IUCN} | |
| | Siberian weasel | Mustela sibirica Pallas, 1773 | Rocky areas in far north | LC^{IUCN} | |
| | Back-striped weasel | Mustela strigidorsa Gray, 1853 | Mountainous evergreen forest | LC^{IUCN} | |
| | Greater hog badger | Arctonyx collaris Cuvier, 1825 | Mainly forest | VU^{IUCN} ▼ | |
| | Burmese ferret-badger | Melogale personata I. Geoffroy Saint-Hilaire, 1831 | Forests, shrublands, & grasslands | LC^{IUCN} Unknown | |
| | Eurasian otter | Lutra lutra Linnaeus, 1758 | Wide range of aquatic habitats | NT^{IUCN} ▼ | |
| | Hairy-nosed otter | Lutra sumatrana Gray, 1865 | Wide range of aquatic habitats | EN^{IUCN} ▼ | |
| | Smooth-coated otter | Lutrogale perspicillata Geoffroy Saint Hilaire, 1826 | Wide range of aquatic habitats, including flooded ricefields | VU^{IUCN} ▼ | |
| | Asian small-clawed otter | Aonyx cinereus Illiger, 1815 | Wetland systems | VU^{IUCN} ▼ | |
| | Malayan weasel | Mustela nudipes Desmarest, 1822 | Sundaic evergreen broad-leafed forest | LC^{IUCN} ▼ | |

== Order: Chiroptera (bats) ==
| Image | Common name | Scientific name Authority | Preferred habitat | IUCN status | Range |
|---|---|---|---|---|---|
Family Pteropodidae: flying foxes, Old World fruit bats
| | Spotted-winged fruit bat | Balionycteris maculata Thomas, 1893 | Lowland rainforest | LC^{IUCN} Unknown | |
| | Black-capped fruit bat | Chironax melanocephalus Temminck, 1825 | Lowland rainforest | LC^{IUCN} Unknown | |
| | Lesser short-nosed fruit bat | Cynopterus brachyotis Müller, 1838 | Forest | LC^{IUCN} Unknown | |
| | Horsfield's fruit bat | Cynopterus horsfieldii Gray, 1843 | Wide variety of habitat | LC^{IUCN} Unknown | |
| | Greater short-nosed fruit bat | Cynopterus sphinx Vahl, 1797 | Forest | LC^{IUCN} ▲ | |
| | Cave nectar bat | Eonycteris spelaea Dobson, 1871 | Caves & forest | LC^{IUCN} ▼ | |
| | Tailless fruit bat | Megaerops ecaudatus Temminck, 1837 | Forest | LC^{IUCN} | |
| | Ratanaworabhan's fruit bat | Megaerops niphanae Yenbutra & Felten, 1983 | Forest | LC^{IUCN} | |
| | Long-tongued nectar bat | Macroglossus minimus É. Geoffroy, 1810 | Forest | LC^{IUCN} | |
| | Long-tongued fruit bat | Macroglossus sobrinus K. Andersen, 1911 | Forest | LC^{IUCN} | |
| | Small flying fox | Pteropus hypomelanus Temminck, 1853 | Forest | NT^{IUCN} ▼ | |
| | Lyle's flying fox | Pteropus lylei K. Andersen, 1908 | Forest | VU^{IUCN} ▼ | |
| | Large flying fox | Pteropus vampyrus Linnaeus, 1758 | Forest | NT^{IUCN} ▼ | |
| | Geoffroy's rousette | Rousettus amplexicaudatus É. Geoffroy, 1810 | Caves, rocky areas, & forests | LC^{IUCN} Unknown | |
| | Leschenault's rousette | Rousettus leschenaultii Desmarest, 1820 | Caves & forests | NT^{IUCN} ▼ | |
| | Blanford's fruit bat | Sphaerias blanfordi Thomas, 1891 | Bamboo forest | LC^{IUCN} | |
Family Vespertilionidae
| | Bronze sprite | Arielulus circumdatus Temminck, 1840 | Montane forest | LC^{IUCN} Unknown | |
| | Social sprite | Arielulus societatis Hill, 1972 | Forest | LC^{IUCN} ▼ | |
| | Surat helmeted bat | Cassistrellus dimissus Thomas, 1916 | Montane forest | DD^{IUCN} Unknown | |
| | Oriental serotine | Eptesicus pachyomus Tomes, 1857 | Wide variety of habitats | LC^{IUCN} Unknown | |
| | Thick-eared bat | Eptesicus pachyotis Dobson, 1871 | Forest | LC^{IUCN} Unknown | |
| | Serotine bat | Eptesicus serotinus Schreber, 1774 | Wide variety of habitats | LC^{IUCN} | |
| | Indochinese thick-thumbed bat | Glischropus bucephalus Csorba, 2011 | Bamboo forest | LC^{IUCN} Unknown | |
| | Common thick-thumbed bat | Glischropus tylopus Dobson, 1875 | Forest | LC^{IUCN} | |
| | Lesser hairy-winged bat | Harpiocephalus harpia Temminck C. J., 1840 | Forest | LC^{IUCN} ▼ | |
| | Blanford's bat | Hesperoptenus blanfordi Dobson, 1877 | Caves & forests | LC^{IUCN} Unknown | |
| | Tickell's bat | Hesperoptenus tickelli Blyth, 1851 | Caves & forests | LC^{IUCN} Unknown | |
| | Large false serotine | Hesperoptenus tomesi Thomas, 1905 | Caves & forests | VU^{IUCN} ▼ | |
| | Cadorna's pipistrelle | Hypsugo cadornae Thomas, 1916 | Forest | LC^{IUCN} Unknown | |
| | Chinese pipistrelle | Hypsugo pulveratus Peters, 1870 | Limestone forest | LC^{IUCN} Unknown | |
| | Great evening bat | Ia io Thomas, 1902 | Forest | NT^{IUCN} ▼ | |
| | Flat-skulled woolly bat | Kerivoula depressa | Evergreen forest | LC^{IUCN} Unknown | |
| | Indochinese woolly bat | Kerivoula dongduongana | Caves & forest | LC^{IUCN} Unknown | |
| | Hardwicke's woolly bat | Kerivoula hardwickii Horsfield, 1824 | Caves & forest | LC^{IUCN} | |
| | Kachin woolly bat | Kerivoula kachinensis Bates, Struebig, Rossiter, Kingston, Sia Sein Lein Oo & Khin Mya Mya, 2004 | Forest | LC^{IUCN} | |
| | Krau woolly bat | Kerivoula krauensis Francis, Kingston, & Zubaid 2007 | Forest | NT^{IUCN} ▼ | |
| | Least woolly bat | Kerivoula minuta Miller, 1898 | Forest | NT^{IUCN} ▼ | |
| | Papillose woolly bat | Kerivoula papillosa Temminck, 1840 | Forest | LC^{IUCN} | |
| | Clear-winged woolly bat | Kerivoula pellucida Waterhouse, 1845 | Forest | NT^{IUCN} ▼ | |
| | Painted bat | Kerivoula picta Pallas, 1767 | Wide variety of habitats | NT^{IUCN} ▼ | |
| | Titania's woolly bat | Kerivoula titania Bates, Struebig, Hayes, Furey, Mya Mya, Thong, Tien, Son, Harrison, Francis & Csorba, 2007 | Forest | LC^{IUCN} Unknown | |
| | Whitehead's woolly bat | Kerivoula whiteheadi Thomas, 1894 | Forest & grassland | LC^{IUCN} Unknown | |
| | Bronze tube-nosed bat | Murina aenea Hill, 1964 | Forest | VU^{IUCN} ▼ | |
| | Annam tube-nosed bat | Murina annamitica | Forest | LC^{IUCN} Unknown | |
| | Bala tube-nosed bat | Murina balaensis Soisook, Karapan, Satasook & Bates, 2013 | Evergreen forest | CR^{IUCN} Unknown | |
| | Fea's tube-nosed bat | Murina feae | Forest | LC^{IUCN} Unknown | |
| | Harrison's tube-nosed bat | Murina harrisoni Csorba & Bates 2005 | Forest | LC^{IUCN} Unknown | |
| | Hutton's tube-nosed bat | Murina huttoni Peters, 1872 | Forest | LC^{IUCN} Unknown | |
| | Brown tube-nosed bat | Murina suilla Temminck, 1840 | Lowland dipterocarp forest | LC^{IUCN} Unknown | |
| | Szechwan myotis | Myotis altarium Thomas, 1911 | Caves | LC^{IUCN} Unknown | |
| | Hairy-faced bat | Myotis annectans Dobson, 1871 | Evergreen forest | LC^{IUCN} Unknown | |
| | Peters's myotis | Myotis ater Peters, 1866 | Forest | LC^{IUCN} Unknown | |
| | Large myotis | Myotis chinensis Tomes, 1857 | Caves & forest | LC^{IUCN} Unknown | |
| | Lesser large-footed bat | Myotis hasseltii Temminck, 1840 | Caves & forests | LC^{IUCN} Unknown | |
| | Herman's myotis | Myotis hermani Thomas, 1923 | Forest | DD^{IUCN} Unknown | |
| | Horsfield's bat | Myotis horsfieldii Temminck, 1840 | Caves & forest | LC^{IUCN} | |
| | Burmese whiskered myotis | Myotis montivagus Dobson, 1874 | Caves & forest | DD^{IUCN} | |
| | Wall-roosting mouse-eared bat | Myotis muricola Gray, 1846 | Caves & forests | LC^{IUCN} | |
| | Ridley's bat | Myotis ridleyi Gray, 1846 | Forest | NT^{IUCN} ▼ | |
| | Thick-thumbed myotis | Myotis rosseti Oey, 1951 | Forest | LC^{IUCN} Unknown | |
| | Himalayan whiskered bat | Myotis siligorensis Horsfield, 1855 | Caves & forests | LC^{IUCN} Unknown | |
| | Groove-toothed bat | Phoniscus atrox Miller, 1905 | Forest | NT^{IUCN} ▼ | |
| | Peters's trumpet-eared bat | Phoniscus jagorii Peters, 1866 | Forest & wetlands | LC^{IUCN} Unknown | |
| | Indian pipistrelle | Pipistrellus coromandra Gray, 1838 | Caves & forests | LC^{IUCN} Unknown | |
| | Java pipistrelle | Pipistrellus javanicus Gray, 1838 | Caves & forest | LC^{IUCN} | |
| | Mount Popa pipistrelle | Pipistrellus paterculus Thomas, 1915 | Caves & forest | LC^{IUCN} Unknown | |
| | Narrow-winged pipistrelle | Pipistrellus stenopterus Dobson, 1875 | Forest, shrubland, & grassland | LC^{IUCN} Unknown | |
| | Least pipistrelle | Pipistrellus tenuis Temminck C. J., 1840 | Forest, shrubland, & grassland | LC^{IUCN} | |
| | Harlequin bat | Scotomanes ornatus Blyth, 1851 | Caves & forests | LC^{IUCN} Unknown | |
| | Greater Asiatic yellow bat | Scotophilus heathii Horsfield, 1831 | Forest & shrublands | LC^{IUCN} | |
| | Lesser Asiatic yellow bat | Scotophilus kuhlii Leach, 1821 | Forest & shrublands | LC^{IUCN} | |
| | Collared sprite | Thainycteris aureocollaris Kock & Storch, 1996 | Montane evergreen forest | LC^{IUCN} Unknown | |
| | Greater bamboo bat | Tylonycteris robustula Thomas, 1915 | Caves & forests | LC^{IUCN} Unknown | |
Family Miniopteridae
| | Western bent-winged bat | Miniopterus magnater Sanborn, 1931 | Caves & forest | LC^{IUCN} Unknown | |
| | Intermediate long-fingered bat | Miniopterus medius Thomas & Wroughton, 1909 | Caves & forest | LC^{IUCN} Unknown | |
| | Small bent-winged bat | Miniopterus pusillus Dobson, 1876 | Caves & forest | LC^{IUCN} Unknown | |
Family Craseonycteridae
| | Kitti's hog-nosed bat | Craseonycteris thonglongyai Hill, 1974 | Karst near rivers; world's smallest bat | NT^{IUCN} ▼ | |
Family Molossidae: free-tailed bats
| | Northern free-tailed bat | Chaerephon johorensis Dobson, 1873 | Forest | VU^{IUCN} ▼ | |
| | Wrinkle-lipped free-tailed bat | Chaerephon plicatus Buchanan, 1800 | Caves, rocky areas, savanna & forests | LC^{IUCN} Unknown | |
| | Hairless bat | Cheiromeles torquatus Horsfield, 1824 | Caves & forests | LC^{IUCN} Unknown | |
| | Malayan free-tailed bat | Mops mops Blainville, 1840 | Forest | NT^{IUCN} ▼ | |
| | La Touche's free-tailed bat | Tadarida latouchei Thomas, 1920 | Caves & forest | EN^{IUCN} ▼ | |
Family Emballonuridae
| | Lesser sheath-tailed bat | Emballonura monticola Temminck, 1838 | Caves & forest | LC^{IUCN} | |
| | Naked-rumped pouched bat | Saccolaimus saccolaimus Temminck, 1838 | Caves, forest, & savanna | LC^{IUCN} | |
| | Long-winged tomb bat | Taphozous longimanus Hardwicke, 1825 | Caves, rocky areas, savanna & forests | LC^{IUCN} | |
| | Black-bearded tomb bat | Taphozous melanopogon Temminck, 1841 | Caves, rocky areas, shrubland & forests | LC^{IUCN} | |
| | Theobald's tomb bat | Taphozous theobaldi Dobson, 1872 | Caves & forest | LC^{IUCN} Unknown | |
Family Nycteridae: slit-faced bats
| | Malayan slit-faced bat | Nycteris tragata K. Andersen, 1912 | Caves & forest | NT^{IUCN} ▼ | |
Family Megadermatidae: false vampire bats
| | Thongaree's disc-nosed bat | Eudiscoderma thongareeae Soisook, Prajakjitr, Karapan, Francis & Bates, 2015 | Only known from one location in Hala-Bala Wildlife Sanctuary | CR^{IUCN} ▼ | |
| | Greater false vampire bat | Lyroderma lyra E. Geoffroy, 1810 | Caves, rocky areas & forests | LC^{IUCN} Unknown | |
| | Lesser false vampire bat | Megaderma spasma Linnaeus, 1758 | Caves, rocky areas & forests | LC^{IUCN} Unknown | |
Family Rhinolophidae: horseshoe bats
| | Acuminate horseshoe bat | Rhinolophus acuminatus Peters, 1871 | Caves & forests | LC^{IUCN} Unknown | |
| | Intermediate horseshoe bat | Rhinolophus affinis Horsfield, 1823 | Caves & forests | LC^{IUCN} | |
| | Croslet horseshoe bat | Rhinolophus coelophyllus Peters, 1867 | Caves & forests | LC^{IUCN} | |
| | Blyth's horseshoe bat | Rhinolophus lepidus Blyth, 1844 | Caves & forests | LC^{IUCN} Unknown | |
| | Great woolly horseshoe bat | Rhinolophus luctus Temminck, 1835 | Caves, rocky areas, & forests | LC^{IUCN} Unknown | |
| | Big-eared horseshoe bat | Rhinolophus macrotis Blyth, 1844 | Caves & forest | LC^{IUCN} | |
| | Malayan horseshoe bat | Rhinolophus malayanus Bonhote, 1903 | Caves & forests | LC^{IUCN} | |
| | Marshall's horseshoe bat | Rhinolophus marshalli Thonglongya, 1973 | Caves & forests | LC^{IUCN} | |
| | Indo-Chinese lesser brown horseshoe bat | Rhinolophus microglobosus Csorba and Jenkins, 1998 | Caves & forests | LC^{IUCN} | |
| | Bourret's horseshoe bat | Rhinolophus paradoxolophus Bourret, 1951 | Caves & forests | LC^{IUCN} | |
| | Pearson's horseshoe bat | Rhinolophus pearsonii Horsfield, 1851 | Caves & forests | LC^{IUCN} Unknown | |
| | Least horseshoe bat | Rhinolophus pusillus Temminck, 1834 | Caves & forests | LC^{IUCN} | |
| | Peninsular horseshoe bat | Rhinolophus robinsoni K. Andersen, 1918 | Forest | NT^{IUCN} ▼ | |
| | Shamel's horseshoe bat | Rhinolophus shameli Tate, 1943 | Caves & forests | LC^{IUCN} | |
| | Thai horseshoe bat | Rhinolophus siamensis Gyldenstolpe, 1917 | Caves & evergreen forests | LC^{IUCN} Unknown | |
| | Lesser brown horseshoe bat | Rhinolophus stheno K. Andersen, 1905 | Forest | LC^{IUCN} | |
| | Thailand horseshoe bat | Rhinolophus thailandensis Wu, Harada & Motokawa, 2009 | Caves & forest | LC^{IUCN} | |
| | Thomas's horseshoe bat | Rhinolophus thomasi K. Andersen, 1905 | Caves & forests | LC^{IUCN} Unknown | |
| | Trefoil horseshoe bat | Rhinolophus trifoliatus Temminck, 1834 | Forest | NT^{IUCN} ▼ | |
| | Dobson's horseshoe bat | Rhinolophus yunanensis Dobson, 1872 | Caves & forests | LC^{IUCN} Unknown | |
Family Hipposideridae: Old World leaf-nosed bats
| | Stoliczka's trident bat | Aselliscus stoliczkanus Dobson, 1871 | Caves & forest | LC^{IUCN} Unknown | |
| | East Asian tailless leaf-nosed bat | Coelops frithii Blyth, 1848 | Caves & forest | NT^{IUCN} ▼ | |
| | Great roundleaf bat | Hipposideros armiger Hodgson, 1835 | Caves & forest | LC^{IUCN} Unknown | |
| | Dusky leaf-nosed bat | Hipposideros ater Templeton, 1848 | Forest around limestone | LC^{IUCN} Unknown | |
| | Lesser bicolored leaf-nosed bat | Hipposideros atrox Andersen, 1918 | Forest around limestone | LC^{IUCN} | |
| | Bicolored roundleaf bat | Hipposideros bicolor Temminck, 1853 | Caves & forests | LC^{IUCN} | |
| | Ashy roundleaf bat | Hipposideros cineraceus Blyth, 1853 | Caves & forest | LC^{IUCN} Unknown | |
| | Diadem leaf-nosed bat | Hipposideros diadema É. Geoffroy, 1813 | Caves, savanna, & forests | LC^{IUCN} ▼ | |
| | Cantor's roundleaf bat | Hipposideros galeritus Cantor, 1846 | Caves & forests | LC^{IUCN} Unknown | |
| | Grand roundleaf bat | Hipposideros grandis G.M. Allen, 1936 | Unknown | LC^{IUCN} Unknown | |
| | Thailand roundleaf bat | Hipposideros halophyllus Hill & Yenbutra, 1984 | Caves & forests | VU^{IUCN} ▼ | |
| | Intermediate roundleaf bat | Hipposideros larvatus Horsfield, 1823 | Caves & forests | LC^{IUCN} Unknown | |
| | Large Asian roundleaf bat | Hipposideros lekaguli Thonglongya & Hill, 1974 | Caves & forests | NT^{IUCN} ▼ | |
| | Shield-faced roundleaf bat | Hipposideros lylei Thomas, 1913 | Caves & forest | LC^{IUCN} ▼ | |
| | Pendlebury's roundleaf bat | Hipposideros pendleburyi Chasen, 1936 | Caves & forest | VU^{IUCN} ▼ | |

== Order: Dermoptera (colugos) ==
| Image | Common name | Scientific name Authority | Preferred habitat | IUCN status | Range |
|---|---|---|---|---|---|
Family Cynocephalidae: flying lemurs
| | Sunda flying lemur | Galeopterus variegatus Audebert, 1799 | Forest | LC^{IUCN} ▼ | |

== Order: Eulipotyphla (hedgehogs, shrews, moles and relatives) ==
| Image | Common name | Scientific name Authority | Preferred habitat | IUCN status | Range |
|---|---|---|---|---|---|
Family Erinaceidae: hedgehogs
| | Moonrat | Echinosorex gymnura Raffles, 1822 | Forest | LC^{IUCN} Unknown | |
| | Northern short-tailed gymnure | Hylomys peguensis Blyth, 1859 | Forest & shrubland | | |
Family Soricidae: shrews
| | Asian gray shrew | Crocidura attenuata Milne-Edwards, 1872 | Forest, shrubland, & grassland | LC^{IUCN} Unknown | |
| | Southeast Asian shrew | Crocidura fuliginosa Blyth, 1856 | Forest, shrublands, grasslands & rocky areas | LC^{IUCN} | |
| | Etruscan shrew | Suncus etruscus Savi, 1822 | Wide range of habitat | LC^{IUCN} Unknown | |
| | Malayan pygmy shrew | Suncus malayanus Kloss, 1917 | Forest | LC^{IUCN} Unknown | |
| | Chinese mole shrew | Anourosorex squamipes Milne-Edwards, 1872 | Montane forests | LC^{IUCN} Unknown | |
| | Lowe's shrew | Chodsigoa parca G. M. Allen, 1923 | Forest | LC^{IUCN} Unknown | |
| | Peninsular shrew | Crocidura negligens Robinson & Kloss, 1914 | Forest | LC^{IUCN} Unknown | |
| | Hill's shrew | Crocidura hilliana Jenkins & Smith, 1995 | Wide range of lowland habitat | DD^{IUCN} Unknown | |
| | Indochinese shrew | Crocidura indochinensis (Robinson and Kloss, 1922 | Forest | LC^{IUCN} Unknown | |
| | Voracious shrew | Crocidura vorax Allen, 1923 | Wide variety of habitats | LC^{IUCN} Unknown | |
| | Asian house shrew | Suncus murinus Linnaeus, 1766 | Widespread | LC^{IUCN} | |
Family Talpidae: moles
| | Kloss's mole | Euroscaptor klossi Thomas, 1929 | Forest | LC^{IUCN} Unknown | |

== Order: Lagomorpha (lagomorphs) ==
| Image | Common name | Scientific name Authority | Preferred habitat | IUCN status | Range |
|---|---|---|---|---|---|
Family Leporidae: rabbits, hares
| | Burmese hare | Lepus peguensis Blyth, 1855 | Grasslands, shrublands, savanna, & forest | LC^{IUCN} | |

== Order: Perissodactyla (odd-toed ungulates) ==
| Image | Common name | Scientific name Authority | Preferred habitat | IUCN status | Range |
|---|---|---|---|---|---|
Family Tapiridae
| | Malayan tapir | Tapirus indicus Desmarest, 1819 | Tropical moist forests | EN^{IUCN} ▼ | |

== Order: Pholidota (pangolins) ==
| Image | Common name | Scientific name Authority | Preferred habitat | IUCN status | Range |
|---|---|---|---|---|---|
Family Manidae
| | Sunda pangolin | Manis javanica Desmarest, 1822 | Forest & shrubland | CR^{IUCN} ▼ | |
| | Chinese pangolin | Manis pentadactyla Linnaeus, 1758 | Forest, grassland, & shrubland | CR^{IUCN} ▼ | |

== Order: Primates ==
| Image | Common name | Scientific name Authority | Preferred habitat | IUCN status | Range |
|---|---|---|---|---|---|
Family Lorisidae: lorises, bushbabies
| | Bengal slow loris | Nycticebus bengalensis Lacépède, 1800 | Forest | EN^{IUCN} ▼ | |
| | Sunda slow loris | Nycticebus coucang Boddaert, 1785 | Forest | EN^{IUCN} ▼ | |
Family Cercopithecidae: Old World monkeys
| | Stump-tailed macaque | Macaca arctoides I. Geoffroy, 1831 | Forest | VU^{IUCN} ▼ | |
| | Crab-eating macaque | Macaca fascicularis Raffles, 1821 | Forest, wetlands, & intertidal marine zone | EN^{IUCN} ▼ | |
| | Northern pig-tailed macaque | Macaca leonina Blyth, 1863 | Forest | VU^{IUCN} ▼ | |
| | Assam macaque | Macaca assamensis McClelland, 1840 | Forest | NT^{IUCN} ▼ | |
| | Rhesus macaque | Macaca mulatta Zimmermann, 1780 | Widespread, including around humans | LC^{IUCN} Unknown | |
| | Southern pig-tailed macaque | Macaca nemestrina Linnaeus, 1766 | Forest and plantations | EN^{IUCN} ▼ | |
| | Indochinese grey langur | Trachypithecus crepusculus Elliot, 1909 | Forest & limestone karst | EN^{IUCN} ▼ | |
| | Germain's langur | Trachypithecus germaini Milne-Edwards, 1876 | Forest & rocky areas | EN^{IUCN} ▼ | |
| | Dusky leaf monkey | Trachypithecus obscurus Reid, 1837 | Forest & around humans | EN^{IUCN} ▼ | |
| | Tenasserim lutung | Trachypithecus barbei Blyth, 1847 | Evergreen forest | VU^{IUCN} ▼ | |
| | Tenasserim lutung | Trachypithecus barbei Blyth, 1847 | Evergreen forest | VU^{IUCN} ▼ | |
| | Robinson's banded langur | Presbytis robinsoni Thomas, 1910 | Lowland rainforest | NT^{IUCN} ▼ | |
| | White-thighed surili | Presbytis siamensis Müller & Schlegel, 1838 | Forest | NT^{IUCN} ▼ | |
Family Hylobatidae: gibbons
| | Lar gibbon | Hylobates lar Linnaeus, 1771 | Evergreen & semi-evergreen forest | EN^{IUCN} ▼ | |
| | Pileated gibbon | Hylobates pileatus Gray, 1861 | Forest | EN^{IUCN} ▼ | |
| | Agile gibbon | Hylobates agilis F. Cuvier, 1821 | Forest | EN^{IUCN} ▼ | |
| | Siamang | Symphalangus syndactylus F. Cuvier, 1821 | Forest | EN^{IUCN} ▼ | Siamang (Symphalangus syndactylus) range |
Family Hominidae: great apes
| | Human | Homo sapiens Linnaeus, 1758 | Widespread | LC ▲ | |

== Order: Proboscidea (elephants) ==
| Image | Common name | Scientific name Authority | Preferred habitat | IUCN status | Range |
|---|---|---|---|---|---|
Family Elephantidae: elephants
| | Asian elephant | Elephas maximus Linnaeus, 1758 | Forest, shrubland, grassland | EN^{IUCN} ▼ | |

== Order: Rodentia (rodents) ==
| Image | Common name | Scientific name Authority | Preferred habitat | IUCN status | Range |
|---|---|---|---|---|---|
Family Hystricidae: Old World porcupines
| | Asiatic brush-tailed porcupine | Atherurus macrourus Linnaeus, 1758 | Montane forest | LC^{IUCN} ▼ | |
| | Malayan porcupine | Hystrix brachyura Linnaeus, 1758 | Forest, shrubland, & grassland | LC^{IUCN} ▼ | |
Family Sciuridae: squirrels
| | Black flying squirrel | Aeromys tephromelas Günther, 1873 | Forest | DD^{IUCN} Unknown | |
| | Hairy-footed flying squirrel | Belomys pearsonii Gray, 1842 | Dry deciduous forest | DD^{IUCN} Unknown | |
| | Grey-bellied squirrel | Callosciurus caniceps Gray, 1842 | Forest & plantations | LC^{IUCN} | |
| | Pallas's squirrel | Callosciurus erythraeus Pallas, 1779 | Montane forest & scrubland | LC^{IUCN} | |
| | Finlayson's squirrel | Callosciurus finlaysonii Horsfield, 1823 | Forest, shrubland, & inland wetlands | LC^{IUCN} | |
| | Black-striped squirrel | Callosciurus nigrovittatus Horsfield, 1824 | Forest | LC^{IUCN} | |
| | Plantain squirrel | Callosciurus notatus Boddaert, 1785 | Wide variety of habitats | LC^{IUCN} ▲ | |
| | Prevost's squirrel | Callosciurus prevostii Desmarest, 1822 | Forest | LC^{IUCN} ▼ | |
| | Asian red-cheeked squirrel | Dremomys rufigenis Blanford, 1878 | Forest & shrubland | LC^{IUCN} | |
| | Particolored flying squirrel | Hylopetes alboniger Hodgson, 1836 | Forest & shrubland | LC^{IUCN} ▼ | |
| | Indochinese flying squirrel | Hylopetes phayrei Blyth, 1859 | Lower montane & mixed deciduous forests | LC^{IUCN} | |
| | Jentink's flying squirrel | Hylopetes platyurus Jentink, 1890 | Wide variety of habitats | DD^{IUCN} Unknown | |
| | Red-cheeked flying squirrel | Hylopetes spadiceus Blyth, 1859 | Forest & scrubland | LC^{IUCN} Unknown | |
| | Three-striped ground squirrel | Lariscus insignis F. Cuvier, 1821 | Forest | LC^{IUCN} ▼ | |
| | Berdmore's ground squirrel | Menetes berdmorei Blyth, 1849 | Forest, shrubland, & grassland | LC^{IUCN} | |
| | Spotted giant flying squirrel | Petaurista elegans Müller, 1840 | Montane forest | LC^{IUCN} | |
| | Red giant flying squirrel | Petaurista petaurista Pallas, 1766 | Forest | LC^{IUCN} ▼ | |
| | Indian giant flying squirrel | Petaurista philippensis Elliot, 1839 | Forest | LC^{IUCN} ▼ | |
| | Temminck's flying squirrel | Petinomys setosus Temminck, 1844 | Forest | VU^{IUCN} ▼ | |
| | Smoky flying squirrel | Pteromyscus pulverulentus Thomas, 1908 | Lowland forest | EN^{IUCN} ▼ | |
| | Cream-coloured giant squirrel | Ratufa affinis Raffles, 1821 | Evergreen forests | NT^{IUCN} ▼ | |
| | Black giant squirrel | Ratufa bicolor Sparrman, 1778 | Forest | NT^{IUCN} ▼ | |
| | Shrew-faced squirrel | Rhinosciurus laticaudatus S. Müller, 1840 | Lowland forest | NT^{IUCN} ▼ | |
| | Horse-tailed squirrel | Sundasciurus hippurus I. Geoffroy, 1831 | Lowland forest | NT^{IUCN} ▼ | |
| | Low's squirrel | Sundasciurus lowii Thomas, 1892 | Forest | LC^{IUCN} | |
| | Slender squirrel | Sundasciurus tenuis Horsfield, 1824 | Forest | LC^{IUCN} ▼ | |
| | Himalayan striped squirrel | Tamiops mcclellandii Horsfield, 1840 | Forest, shrubland, grassland, & inland wetlands | LC^{IUCN} | |
| | Cambodian striped squirrel | Tamiops rodolphii Milne-Edwards, 1867 | Forest & shrubland | LC^{IUCN} | |
Family Spalacidae
| | Lesser bamboo rat | Cannomys badius Hodgson, 1841 | Forest | LC^{IUCN} Unknown | |
| | Hoary bamboo rat | Rhizomys pruinosus Blyth, 1851 | Forest & grassland | LC^{IUCN} | |
| | Large bamboo rat | Rhizomys sumatrensis Raffles, 1821 | Forest | LC^{IUCN} Unknown | |
Family Cricetidae
| | Père David's vole | Eothenomys melanogaster Milne-Edwards, 1871 | Forest, shrubland, & grassland | LC^{IUCN} | |
Family Muridae: mice, rats, gerbils
| | Lesser bandicoot rat | Bandicota bengalensis Gray, 1835 | Primarily cropland; introduced | LC^{IUCN} ▲ | |
| | Greater bandicoot rat | Bandicota indica Bechstein, 1800 | Primarily cropland & cities | LC^{IUCN} ▲ | |
| | Savile's bandicoot rat | Bandicota savilei Thomas, 1916 | Primarily cropland | LC^{IUCN} | |
| | Small white-toothed rat | Berylmys berdmorei Blyth, 1851 | Forest | LC^{IUCN} | |
| | Bower's white-toothed rat | Berylmys bowersi Anderson, 1879 | Wide variety of habitats | LC^{IUCN} ▼ | |
| | Fea's tree rat | Chiromyscus chiropus Thomas, 1891 | Deciduous & evergreen forest | LC^{IUCN} | |
| | Indomalayan pencil-tailed tree mouse | Chiropodomys gliroides Blyth, 1856 | Forest | LC^{IUCN} | |
| | Delacour's marmoset rat | Hapalomys delacouri Thomas, 1927 | Forest | NT^{IUCN} ▼ | |
| | Marmoset rat | Hapalomys longicaudatus Blyth, 1859 | Evergreen lowland forest | EN^{IUCN} ▼ | |
| | Edwards's long-tailed giant rat | Leopoldamys edwardsi Thomas, 1882 | Forest | LC^{IUCN} Unknown | |
| | Neill's long-tailed giant rat | Leopoldamys neilli Marshall, 1976 | Forest | LC^{IUCN} Unknown | |
| | Long-tailed giant rat | Leopoldamys sabanus Thomas, 1887 | Forest | LC^{IUCN} | |
| | Rajah spiny rat | Maxomys rajah Thomas, 1894 | Forest | VU^{IUCN} ▼ | |
| | Red spiny rat | Maxomys surifer Miller, 1900 | Forest | LC^{IUCN} ▼ | |
| | Whitehead's spiny rat | Maxomys whiteheadi Thomas, 1894 | Forest & cropland | VU^{IUCN} ▼ | |
| | Ryukyu mouse | Mus caroli Bonhote, 1902 | Shrubland & grassland | LC^{IUCN} | |
| | Fawn-colored mouse | Mus cervicolor Hodgson, 1845 | Forest, shrubland, & grassland | LC^{IUCN} | |
| | Cook's mouse | Mus cookii Ryley, 1914 | Wide variety of habitat | LC^{IUCN} | |
| | Sheath-tailed mouse | Mus fragilicauda Auffray et al. 2003 | Grassland; only known from two locations | LC^{IUCN} Unknown | |
| | House mouse | Mus musculus Linnaeus, 1758 | Introduced; commensal with humans | LC^{IUCN} | |
| | Gairdner's shrewmouse | Mus pahari Thomas, 1916 | Forest | LC^{IUCN} | |
| | Shortridge's mouse | Mus shortridgei Thomas, 1914 | Grassland & shrubland | LC^{IUCN} | |
| | Chinese white-bellied rat | Niviventer confucianus Milne-Edwards, 1871 | Forest and croplands | LC^{IUCN} | |
| | Dark-tailed tree rat | Niviventer cremoriventer Miller, 1900 | Forest | LC^{IUCN} Unknown | |
| | Chestnut white-bellied rat | Niviventer fulvescens Gray, 1847 | Forest | LC^{IUCN} ▼ | |
| | Limestone rat | Niviventer hinpoon Marshall, 1976 | Karst landscapes | EN^{IUCN} Unknown | |
| | Lang Bian white-bellied rat | Niviventer langbianis Robinson & Kloss, 1922 | Evergreen forest | LC^{IUCN} ▼ | |
| | Tenasserim white-bellied rat | Niviventer tenaster Thomas, 1916 | Montane forest | LC^{IUCN} Unknown | |
| | Sikkim rat | Rattus andamanensis Blyth, 1860 | Forest | LC^{IUCN} | |
| | Ricefield rat | Rattus argentiventer Robinson & Kloss, 1916 | Grassland | LC^{IUCN} | |
| | Polynesian rat | Rattus exulans Peale, 1848 | Widespread | LC^{IUCN} | |
| | Lesser ricefield rat | Rattus losea R. Swinhoe, 1871 | Grassland & cropland | LC^{IUCN} ▲ | |
| | Himalayan field rat | Rattus nitidus (Hodgson, 1845) | Introduced; forest and cropland | LC^{IUCN} | |
| | Brown rat | Rattus norvegicus Berkenhout, 1769 | Introduced; Widespread in the presence of humans | LC^{IUCN} | |
| | Black rat | Rattus rattus Linnaeus, 1758 | Introduced; commensal with humans | LC^{IUCN} | |
| | Tanezumi rat | Rattus tanezumi Temminck, 1844 | Forest, shrublands, & grasslands | LC^{IUCN} ▲ | |
| | Malayan field rat | Rattus tiomanicus Miller, 1900 | Forest, grassland, & agricultural areas | LC^{IUCN} ▲ | |
| | Müller's giant Sunda rat | Sundamys muelleri (Jentink, 1879) | Forest | LC^{IUCN} ▼ | |
| | Asiatic long-tailed climbing mouse | Vandeleuria oleracea Bennett, 1832 | Forest, shrublands, & grasslands | LC^{IUCN} | |

== Order: Scandentia (treeshrews) ==
| Image | Common name | Scientific name Authority | Preferred habitat | IUCN status | Range |
|---|---|---|---|---|---|
Family Tupaiidae: treeshrews
| | Northern smooth-tailed treeshrew | Dendrogale murina Schlegel & S. Müller, 1843 | Forest | LC^{IUCN} ▼ | |
| | Northern treeshrew | Tupaia belangeri Wagner, 1841 | Forest & shrubland | LC^{IUCN} | |
| | Common treeshrew | Tupaia glis Diard & Duvaucel, 1820 | Dipterocarp forest | LC^{IUCN} ▼ | |
| | Pygmy treeshrew | Tupaia minor Günther, 1876 | Forest | LC^{IUCN} ▼ | |
Family Ptilocercidae
| | Pen-tailed treeshrew | Ptilocercus lowii Gray, 1848 | Forest | LC^{IUCN} ▼ | |

== Order: Sirenia (manatees and dugongs) ==
| Image | Common name | Scientific name Authority | Preferred habitat | IUCN status | Range |
|---|---|---|---|---|---|
Family Dugongidae
| | Dugong | Dugong dugon Müller, 1776 | Neritic & intertidal marine zones | VU^{IUCN} ▼ | |

== See also ==
- List of species native to Thailand
- Animal welfare in Thailand
