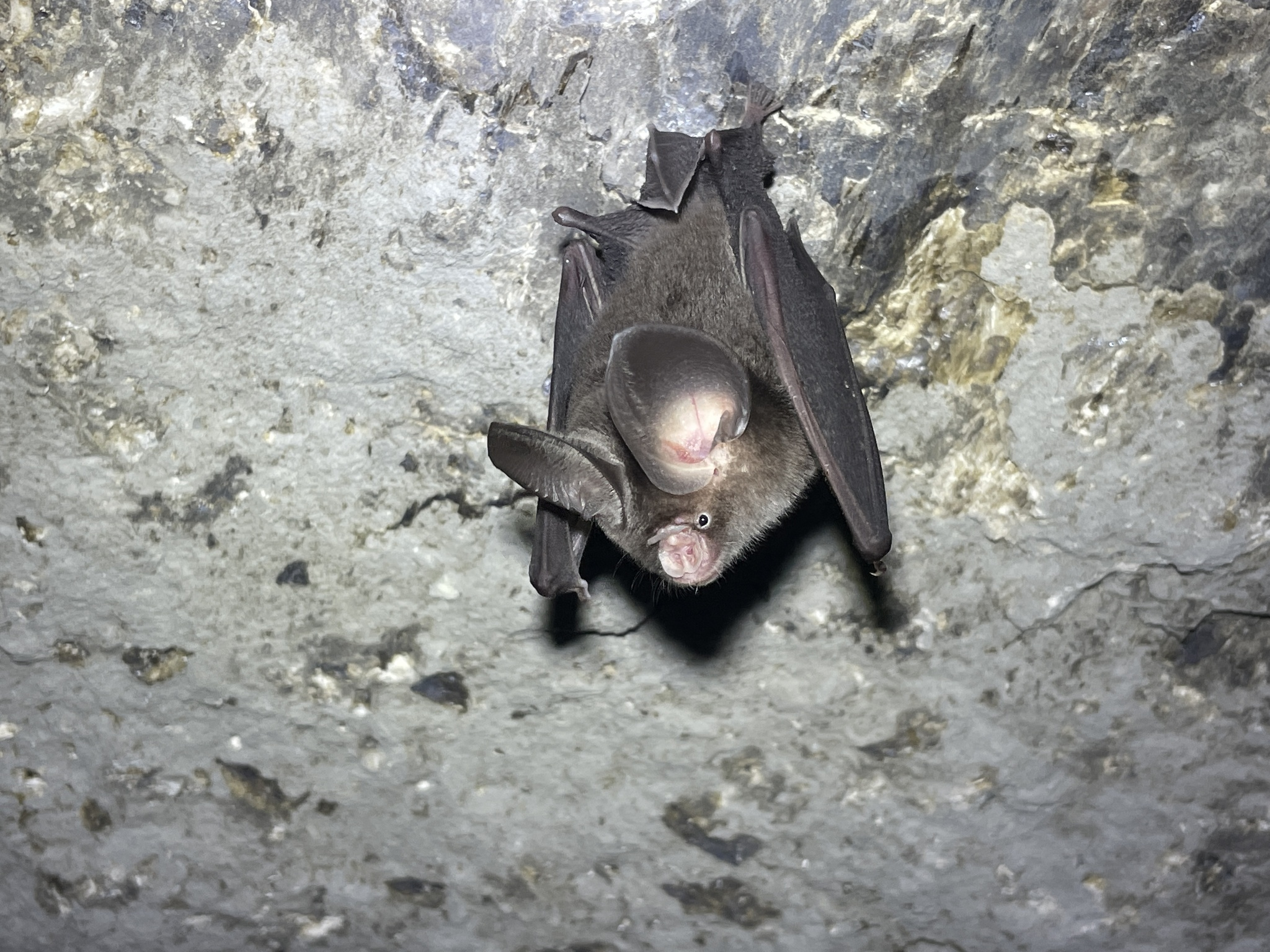

Conservation status
- Least Concern (IUCN 3.1)

Scientific classification
- Kingdom: Animalia
- Phylum: Chordata
- Class: Mammalia
- Infraclass: Placentalia
- Order: Chiroptera
- Family: Hipposideridae
- Genus: Hipposideros
- Species: H. gentilis

Binomial name
- Hipposideros gentilis Andersen, 1918

= Hipposideros gentilis =

Species of bat

Hipposideros gentilis, commonly known as Andersen's leaf-nosed bat or Andersen's roundleaf bat, is a species of roundleaf bat found in Asia.

== Taxonomy ==
Hipposideros gentilis was described as a new species in 1918 by Danish mammalogist Knud Andersen. The holotype had been collected by Edward Yerbury Watson near Thayet, Myanmar. Submitted by his colleague Oldfield Thomas, it was Andersen's final credited publication due to his mysterious disappearance that same year. Andersen additionally described three subspecies as well as the nominate (H. gentilis gentilis):

- H. gentilis sinensis
- H. gentilis atrox
- H. gentilis major

In 1963, British mammalogist John Edwards Hill published that he considered all the subspecies of H. gentilis as subspecies of the bicolored roundleaf bat (H. bicolor). He later considered H. g. gentilis and H. g. sinensis as subspecies of the Pomona roundleaf bat (H. pomona). A 2018 publication stated that H. gentilis should be considered a full species rather than a subspecies due to its distinct baculum, nose-leaf, and echolocation characteristics.

Hipposideros atrox is now considered a full species by some authorities.

== Description ==
Hipposideros gentilis has a forearm length of 39.7–44.1 mm (1.56–1.74 in). Its ears are 17.5–24.0 mm (0.69–0.94 in)

== Range and habitat ==
Its range extends throughout Asia, including Bangladesh, Cambodia, China, India, Laos, Malaysia, Myanmar, Nepal, Thailand, and Vietnam. It can be found at a range of elevations from 0–1,900 m (0–6,234 ft) above sea level in forested or human-modified habitats. During the day, it roosts in caves.
