= Coppery sprite =

Conservation status
- Vulnerable (IUCN 3.1)

Scientific classification
- Kingdom: Animalia
- Phylum: Chordata
- Class: Mammalia
- Order: Chiroptera
- Family: Vespertilionidae
- Genus: Arielulus
- Species: A. cuprosus

Binomial name
- Arielulus cuprosus (Hill & Francis, 1984)
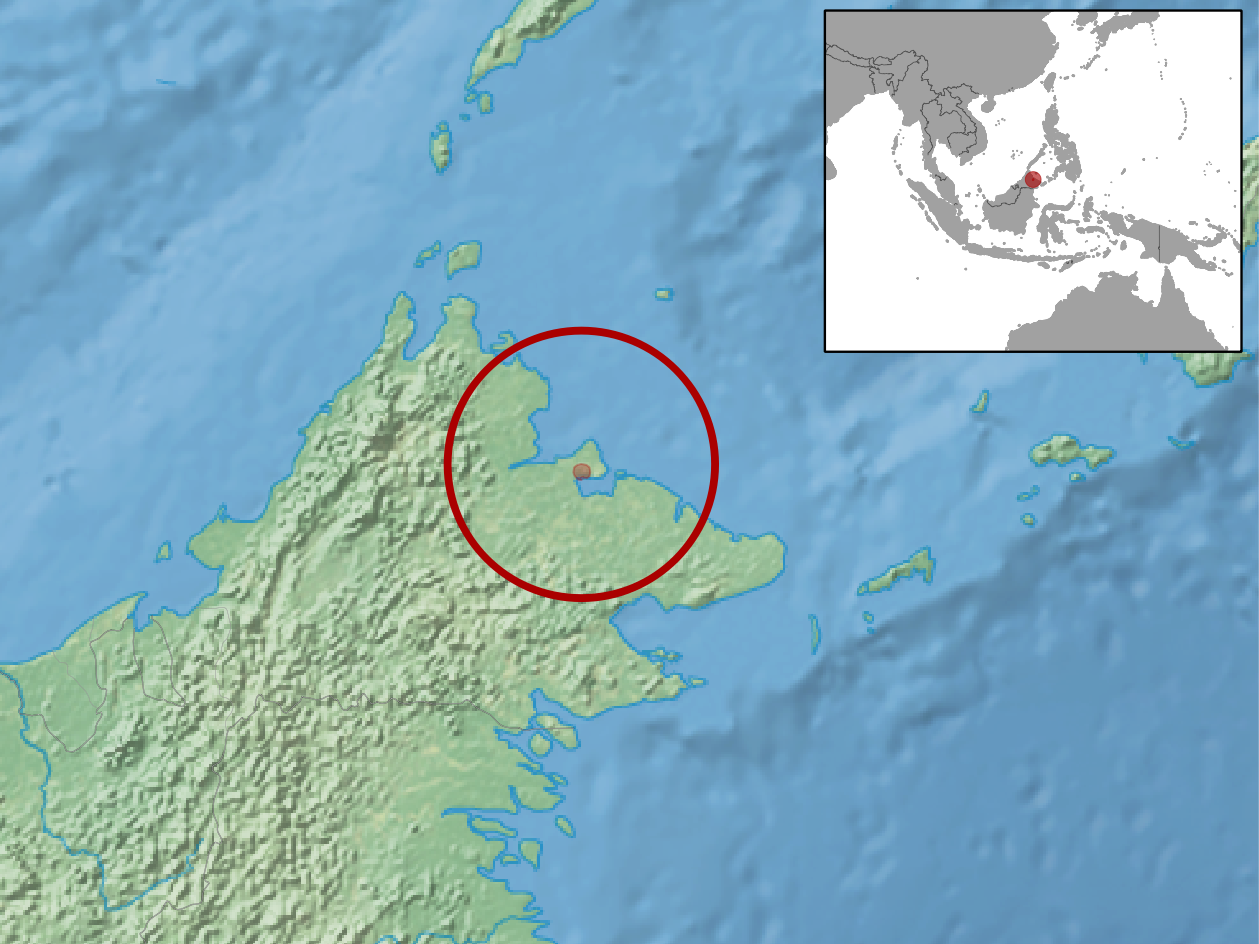

Synonyms
- Pipistrellus cuprosus Hill & Francis, 1984

Species of bat

The coppery sprite (Arielulus cuprosus), also known as the coppery pipistrelle, is a species of vesper bat found only in Malaysia.

== Taxonomy and etymology ==
The coppery sprite was described as a new species in 1984 by British mammalogist John Edwards Hill and Charles M. Francis. They placed it in the genus Pipistrellus with a scientific name of Pipistrellus cuprosus. The holotype had been collected by Francis in 1983 in Sepilok in the Malaysian state of Sabah, which is on the island of Borneo. They chose the species name cuprosus from Latin cuprom to allude to the copper-colored tips of the hair on its back.

A 1999 publication placed the coppery sprite into the then-subgenus Arielulus, with recommendations to raise Arielulus to a full genus.

== Description ==
The coppery sprite can be identified by the fur on its back, which is tipped in a coppery reddish color. Its forearm length is 34.5–36.5 mm (1.36–1.44 in), tail length is 38–39 mm (1.5–1.5 in), and ear length is 12.5 mm (0.49 in). It is a small bat, weighing only 5.3–5.6 g (0.19–0.20 oz).

== Range and habitat ==
The coppery sprite is endemic to Malaysia and has only been found on the island of Borneo. It has been found at a range of elevations from 0–1,784 m (0–5,853 ft) above sea level in forested areas.

== Conservation ==
The coppery sprite is infrequently encountered by researchers. After its initial description from specimens found in 1983, it was not seen again until 1999. As of 2016, it is evaluated as a vulnerable species by the International Union for Conservation of Nature. It meets the criteria for this designation as its area of occupancy is very limited, estimated at only 2,000 km^{2} (770 mi^{2}). Additionally, the extent and quality of its habitat is declining due to deforestation from logging, forest fires, and agriculture.
