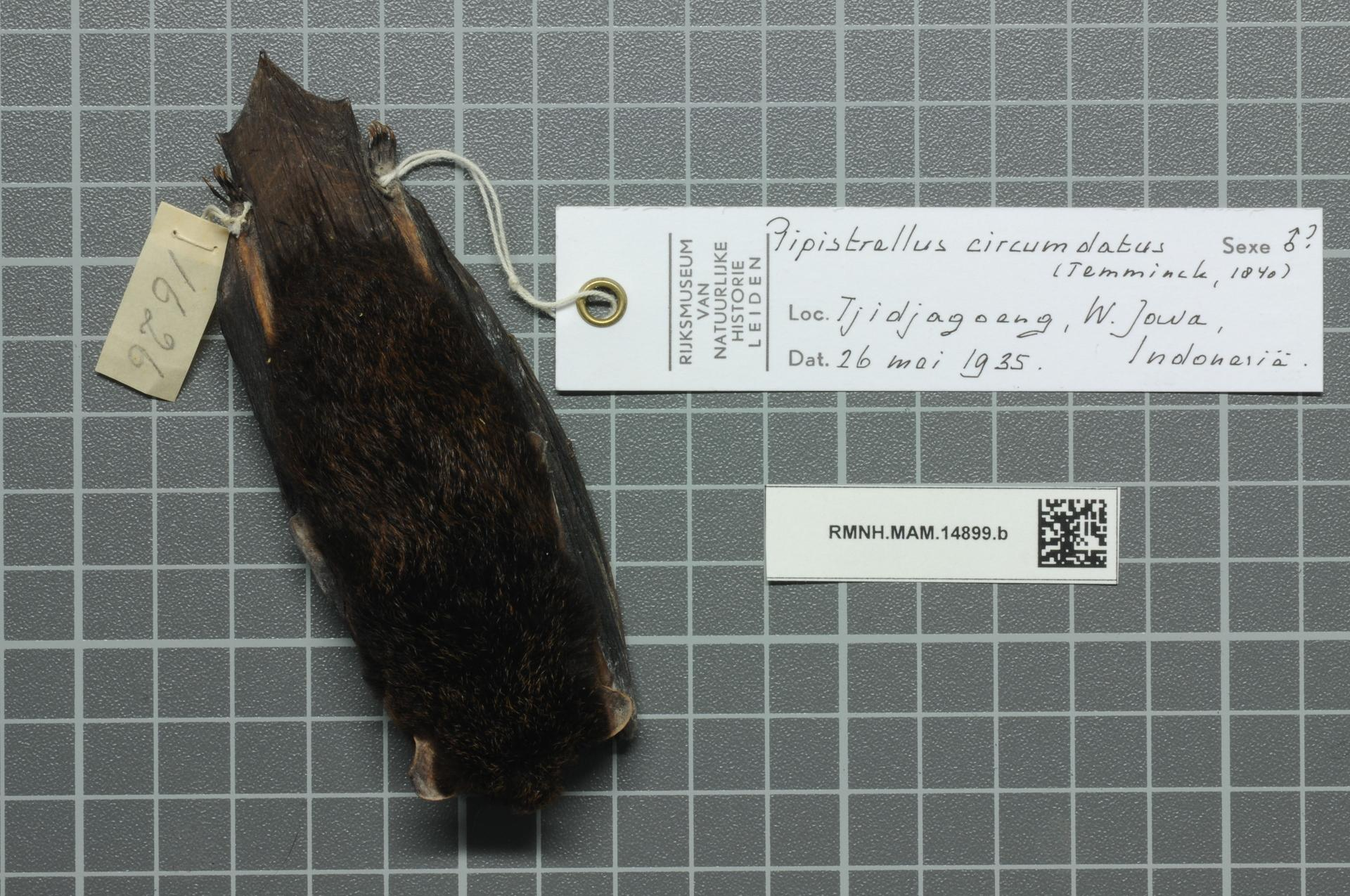
- preserved specimen of Arielulus circumdatus

Scientific classification
- Kingdom: Animalia
- Phylum: Chordata
- Class: Mammalia
- Order: Chiroptera
- Family: Vespertilionidae
- Tribe: Eptesicini
- Genus: Arielulus; Hill & Harrison, 1987

Type species
- Vespertilio circumdatus Temminck, 1840

Species
- See text

= Arielulus =

Genus of bats

Arielulus is a genus of vesper bats with the following species:

Genus Arielulus

- Bronze sprite (A. circumdatus)
- Coppery sprite (A. cuprosus)
- Social sprite (A. societatis)

The collared sprite (T. aureocollaris) and necklace sprite (T. torquatus) in the genus Thainycteris were formerly also classified in Arielulus, but phylogenetic evidence supports them forming a distinct genus.
