= Limestone rat =

Conservation status
- Endangered (IUCN 3.1)

Scientific classification
- Kingdom: Animalia
- Phylum: Chordata
- Class: Mammalia
- Order: Rodentia
- Family: Muridae
- Genus: Niviventer
- Species: N. hinpoon

Binomial name
- Niviventer hinpoon (Marshall, 1976)
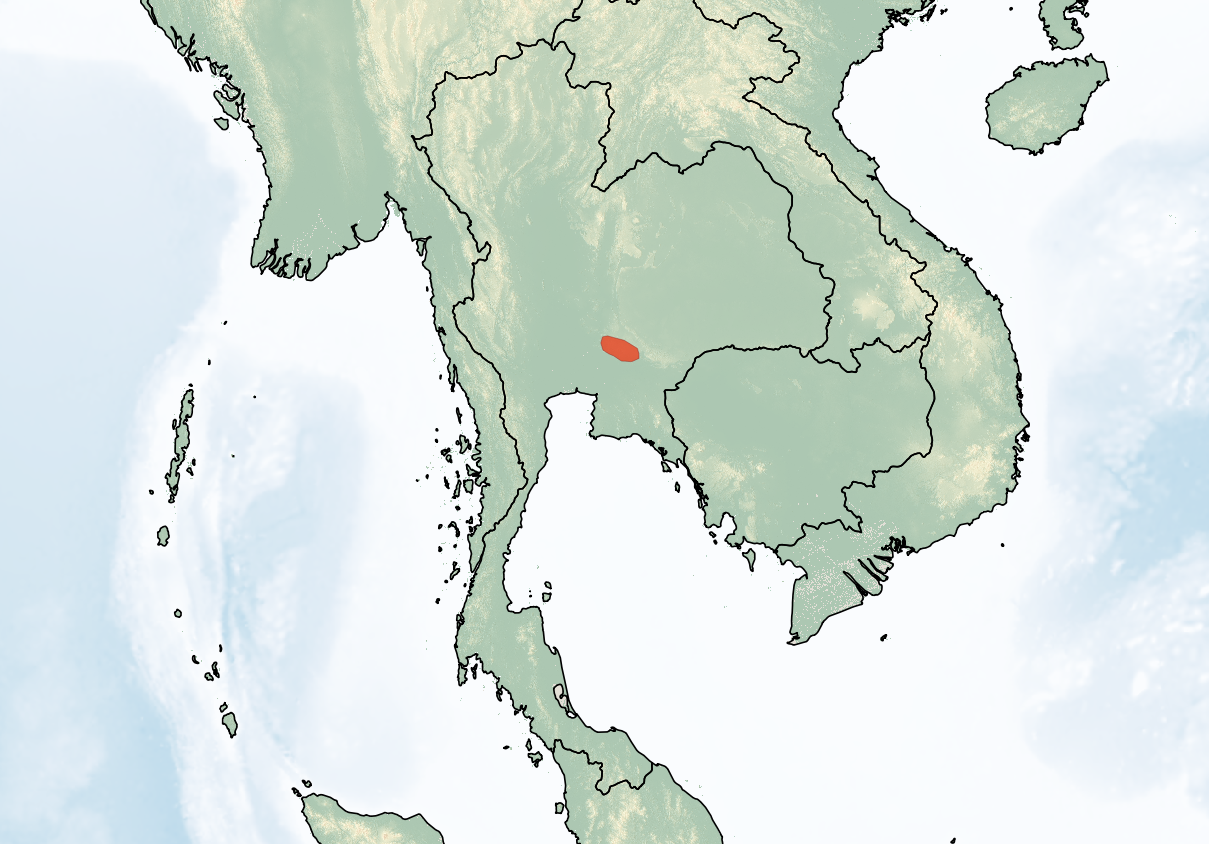

Species of rodent

The limestone rat (Niviventer hinpoon) is a species of rodent in the family Muridae found only in the limestone karsts of Saraburi, Lopburi, Nakhon Sawan provinces, central Thailand. It is listed as an endangered species due to its highly fragmented limestone karst habitat that is currently threatened by mining.

== See Also ==
List of mammals of Thailand
