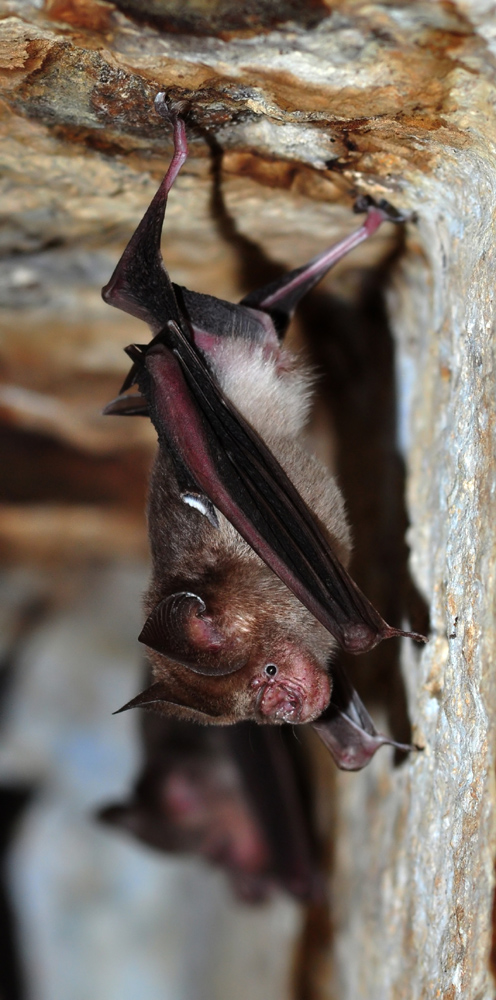
- Profile

Conservation status
- Least Concern (IUCN 3.1)

Scientific classification
- Kingdom: Animalia
- Phylum: Chordata
- Class: Mammalia
- Order: Chiroptera
- Family: Hipposideridae
- Genus: Macronycteris
- Species: H. speoris

Binomial name
- Hipposideros speoris (Schneider, 1800)
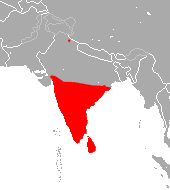
- Schneider's leaf-nosed bat range

Synonyms
- Vespertilio speoris

= Schneider's leaf-nosed bat =

Species of bat

Schneider's leaf-nosed bat or Schneider's roundleaf bat (Hipposideros speoris) is a species of bat in the family Hipposideridae. It is endemic to South Asia. Its natural habitats are subtropical or tropical dry forests, caves, and urban areas.

== Taxonomy ==
It was named after Johann Gottlob Schneider, a German classicist and naturalist who first observed it in 1800.

== Description ==
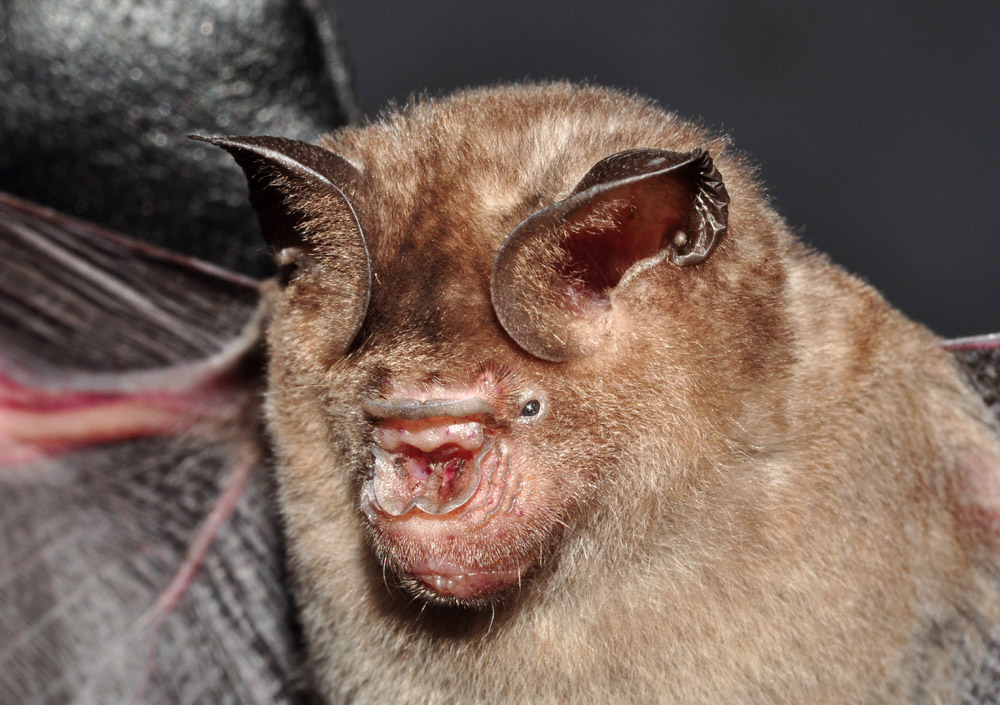
Facial details

This species is a small bat. The bat has three additional leaflets on its leaf-nose, with the outer one being smaller than the other two, and the well-developed lappets next to the nostrils are the external characteristics differentiating this species from other species in the genus Hipposideros. A frontal sac is also present above the leaf-nose. H. speoris varies in color from gray to orange-brown, with it being the palest between the shoulders and on the ventral side, and darker on the flanks and the posterior side. It possesses a tiny baculum, which is just 0.57 mm in length, with a blunt tip and slightly expanded base.

== Biology ==
=== Reproduction ===
The bat has a gestation period of 135–140 days, after which a single young is born. The eyes of newborns are closed and the ears are folded laterally. Their body is hairless and has a dark dorsal and a pink ventral side. The eye slits appear after one week, and the eyes are completely opened after two weeks. They raise their ears on the tenth day and ear movements are noticeable two weeks after birth. When the bats are about one month old their fur is as dense as it is in adults but is of a darker color. Juvenile bats attach themselves to the body of their mothers in a reversed position while sucking at one of two pubic teats. Most females carry their newborns with them when they fly out of the cave for foraging and the majority leave their infants inside the cave once they are older than 7 days. Mothers return regularly before midnight and retrieve their young ones. During retrieval the mothers move towards their infants, gently touch it with the forearm, and present the ventral surface, especially the pubic region. When the infant tries to cling on the body of its mother she turns her body about an angle of 45~ by partly spreading her wing membranes. This posture enables the baby to hold the pubic teats of the mother and to release contact from the rock. Then the infant turns towards the mammary glands and after suckling it stretches either one or both of its wings repeatedly. Apparently mothers spend most of the night inside the cave.

=== Diet ===
The bat tends to fly slowly close to the ground and hunt for insects. It forages only while in flight and uses all available closed and edge habitat. Prey capture occurs mainly in edge vegetation bordering open space. The diet of this species consists mainly of coleopterans, dipterans, mosquitoes and other insects.

=== Echolocation ===
The echolocation signals of H. speoris lack an initial upward frequency-modulated sweep and are of moderate duration (5.1–8.7 ms). Sequences had high duty cycles (23–41%) and very high pulse repetition rates (22.8–60.6 Hz). Hipposiderid bats echolocate with combined CF/ FM-sounds at 127–138 kHz.

== Distribution and habitat ==
The bat is found in India (Andhra Pradesh, Gujarat, Karnataka, Kerala, Maharashtra, Orissa, Tamil Nadu, Telangana, and Uttarakhand), Sri Lanka, and more recently has also been recorded in Pyay, Myanmar. It has been recorded up to an elevation of 1,285 m (4,216 ft) above sea level.

It is commonly found and widespread across its entire range, and roosts in groups of up to 1,000 individuals.

The bats tend to roost in caves, caverns, underground cellars, old forts, palaces, under bridges, old disused buildings, temples, tunnels in dry plains or forested hillsides. While the bats in India are more scattered in the roosts, the bats in Sri Lanka roost together closely.

== Conservation ==
The species is listed by the IUCN as least concern as it has a wide range, can tolerate many habitats, has a large population, and is not thought to be declining rapidly. The species is locally threatened in parts of India because of hunting for local consumption and medicinal purposes, persecution by fumigation, roost disturbance due to tourism related activities, stone quarrying, and developmental activities such as tearing down old disused buildings leading to loss of roosting sites. In Karnataka and Kerala, the species is threatened by the collection of the bats for food and medicine, while in Maharashtra, the species is threatened by disturbance caused by tourism and other human activities. No threats have been identified for the Sri Lankan populations of this bat.

There are no conservation measures in place to protect the species, although the bat has been recorded from some protected areas across its range.
