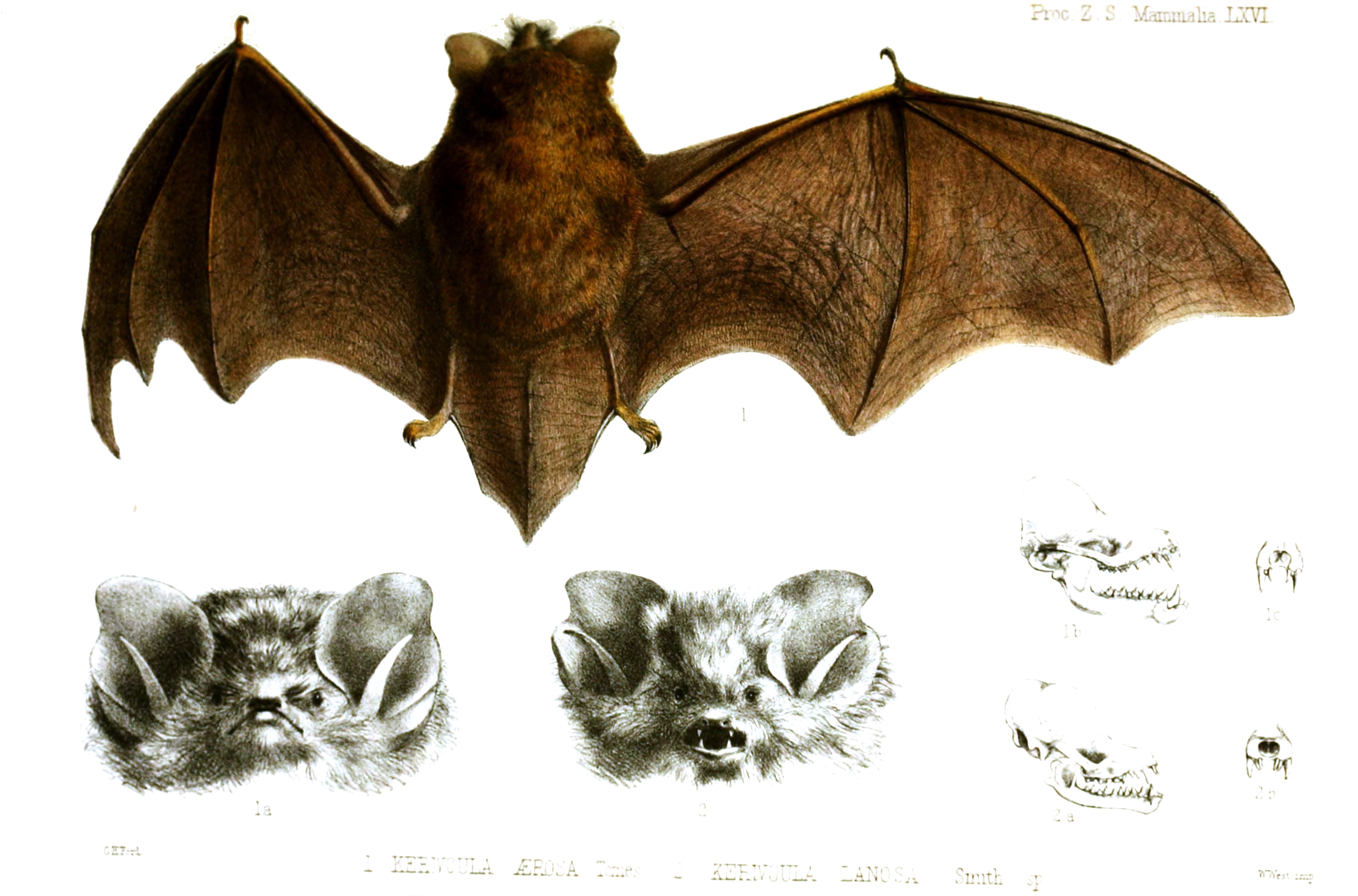

Conservation status
- Data Deficient (IUCN 3.1)

Scientific classification
- Kingdom: Animalia
- Phylum: Chordata
- Class: Mammalia
- Order: Chiroptera
- Family: Vespertilionidae
- Genus: Phoniscus
- Species: P. aerosus

Binomial name
- Phoniscus aerosus (Tomes, 1858)

Synonyms
- Kerivoula aerosa (Tomes, 1858); Phoniscus aerosa Tomes, 1858

= Dubious trumpet-eared bat =

Species of bat

The dubious trumpet-eared bat (Phoniscus aerosus) is a species of vesper bat. It was described as a new species in 1858 by zoologist Robert Fisher Tomes. Tomes placed it in the genus Kerivoula, with a scientific name of Kerivoula aerosa. He gave the type locality as the eastern coast of South Africa, though it is now thought that the specimen's origin was mislabeled and the bat is not considered native to Africa.

Ellis Le Geyt Troughton was the first to assert that the species was likely a member of the genus Phoniscus, not Kerivoula.
