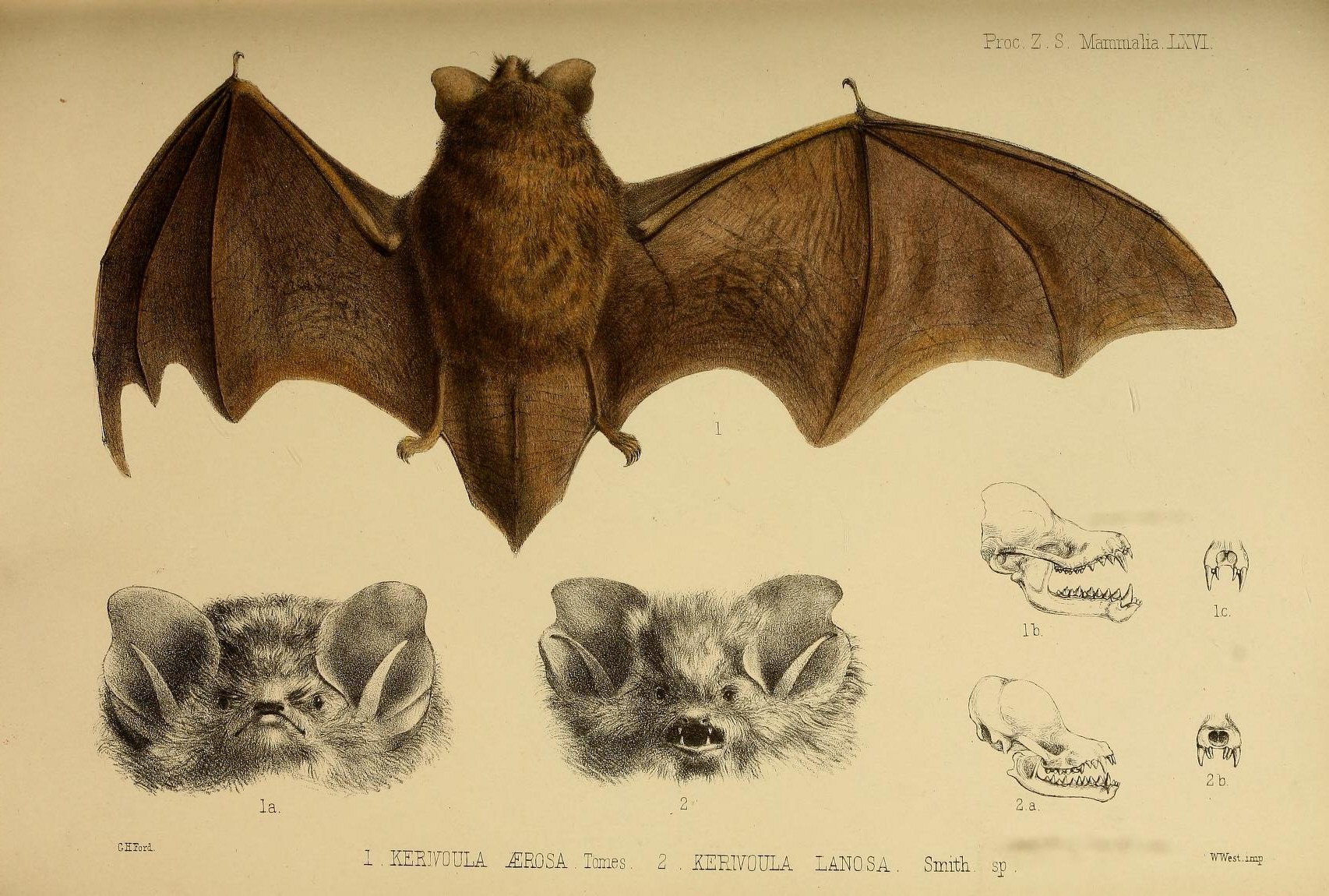
- Phoniscus aerosus (No. 1) alongside Kerivoula lanosa

Scientific classification
- Kingdom: Animalia
- Phylum: Chordata
- Class: Mammalia
- Order: Chiroptera
- Family: Vespertilionidae
- Subfamily: Kerivoulinae
- Genus: Phoniscus; Miller, 1905

Type species
- Phoniscus atrox Miller, 1905

= Phoniscus =

Genus of bats

Phoniscus is a genus of vesper bat in the family Vespertilionidae. It contains the following species:

- Dubious trumpet-eared bat (Phoniscus aerosus)
- Groove-toothed bat (Phoniscus atrox)
- Peters's trumpet-eared bat (Phoniscus jagorii)
- Golden-tipped bat (Phoniscus papuensis)
