= Peters's trumpet-eared bat =

Peters' Trumpet-Eared Bat

Conservation status
- Least Concern (IUCN 3.1)

Scientific classification
- Kingdom: Animalia
- Phylum: Chordata
- Class: Mammalia
- Order: Chiroptera
- Family: Vespertilionidae
- Genus: Phoniscus
- Species: P. jagorii

Binomial name
- Phoniscus jagorii (Peters, 1866)
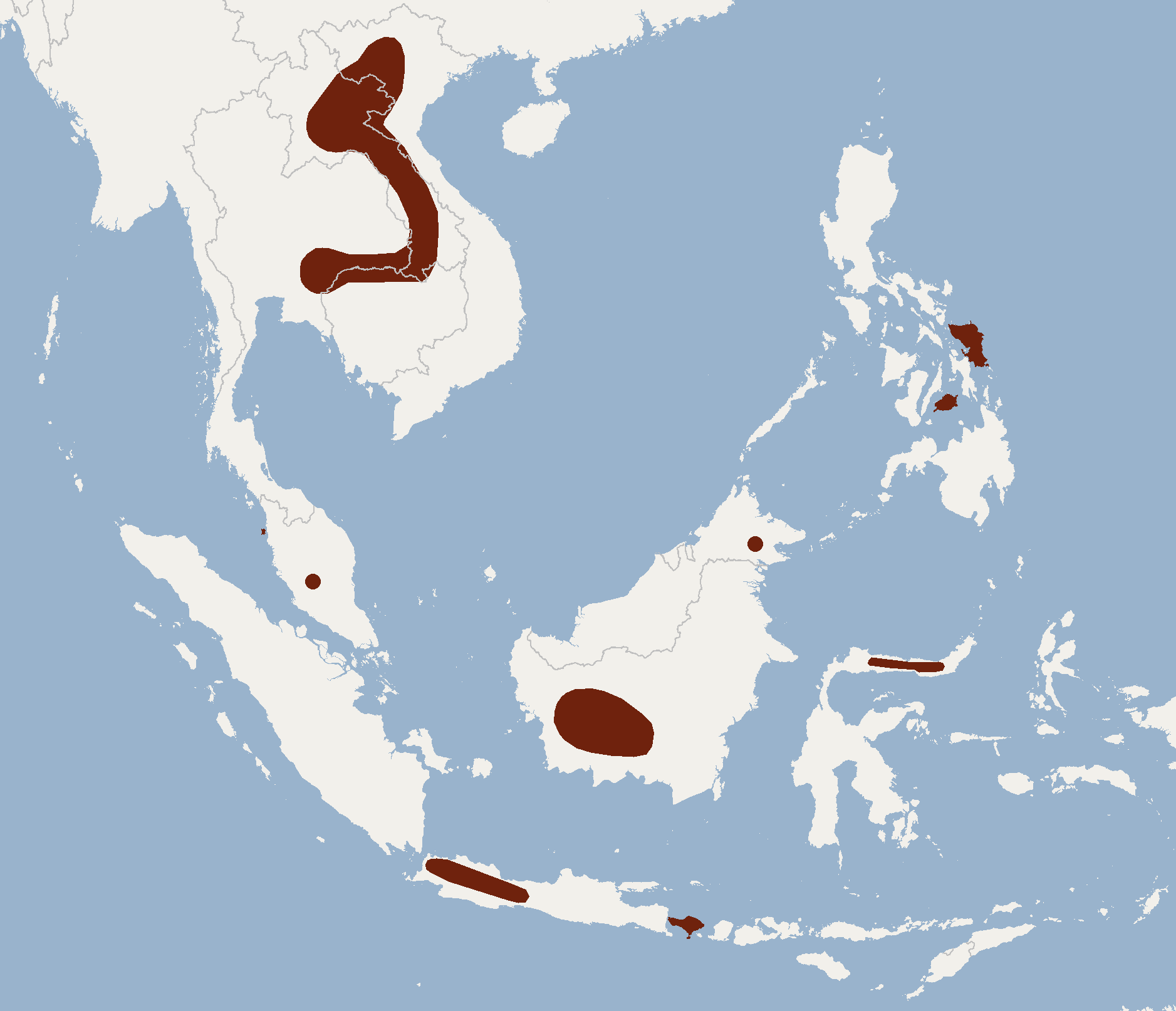

Synonyms
- Kerivoula jagorii (Peters, 1866)

Species of bat

Peters' trumpet-eared bat (Phoniscus jagorii) is a species of bat in the family Vespertilionidae, the vesper bats. It is native to Indonesia, Laos, Malaysia, Vietnam, and the Philippines. It was named by Peters for Fedor Jagor. It is also known as the common trumpet-eared bat and the frosted groove-toothed bat.
