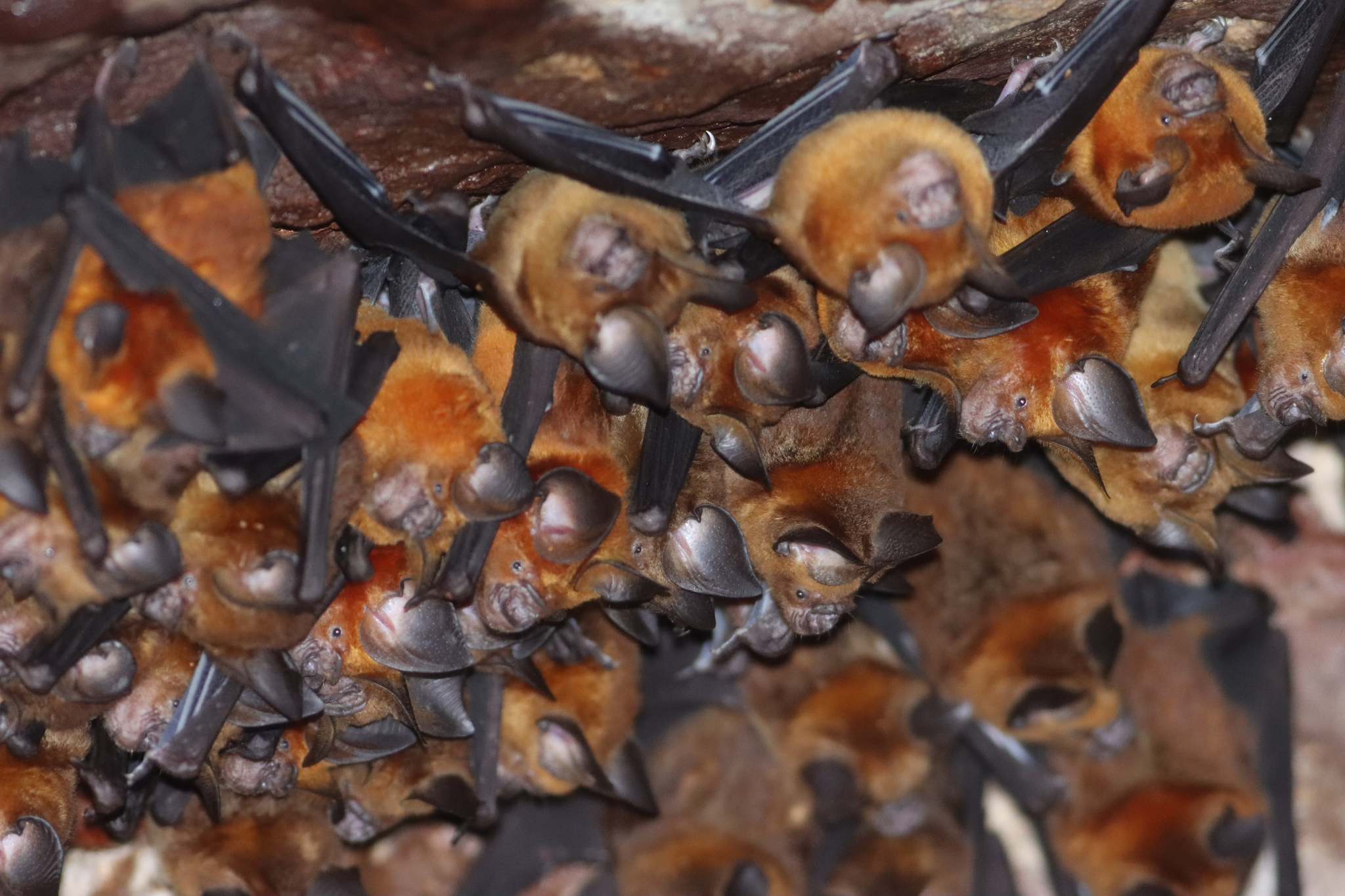

Conservation status
- Least Concern (IUCN 3.1)

Scientific classification
- Kingdom: Animalia
- Phylum: Chordata
- Class: Mammalia
- Infraclass: Placentalia
- Order: Chiroptera
- Family: Hipposideridae
- Genus: Hipposideros
- Species: H. grandis

Binomial name
- Hipposideros grandis G.M. Allen, 1936
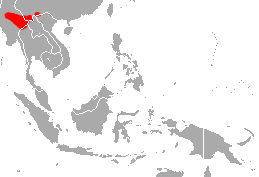

= Grand roundleaf bat =

Species of bat

The grand roundleaf bat (Hipposideros grandis), also known as the grand leaf-nosed bat, is a species of bat in the genus Hipposideros. It can be found in China, Myanmar, Thailand, and Vietnam.

== Taxonomy ==
Per George Henry Hamilton Tate, it was described as a new taxon in 1936 by American zoologist Glover Morrill Allen. Allen listed it as a subspecies of the intermediate roundleaf bat (Hipposideros larvatus). The holotype was collected in Chindwin, Myanmar. It was frequently listed as a subspecies until 2006, when analyses of its echolocation and morphology demonstrated that the grand roundleaf bat is distinct enough to be considered a full species.

== Description ==
Males have a mean forearm length of 60.5 mm (2.38 in), while females have a mean forearm length of 61 mm (2.4 in). Males weigh 18.3 g (0.65 oz), while females weigh 17.6 g (0.62 oz). In India, the species has a peak echolocation frequency of 98 kHz, which helps distinguish it from other Hipposideros species.

== Range and habitat ==
This species is found in several countries in Asia, including China, Myanmar, Thailand, and Vietnam. It is also found in India.

== Conservation ==
As of 2016, it is evaluated as a least-concern species by the IUCN. It meets the criteria for this classification because it has a wide geographic range, it is relatively abundant in Vietnam, and it tolerates some human disturbance to its habitat.
