= Rhinolophus microglobosus =

Conservation status
- Least Concern (IUCN 3.1)

Scientific classification
- Kingdom: Animalia
- Phylum: Chordata
- Class: Mammalia
- Order: Chiroptera
- Family: Rhinolophidae
- Genus: Rhinolophus
- Species: R. microglobosus

Binomial name
- Rhinolophus microglobosus Csorba and Jenkins, 1998
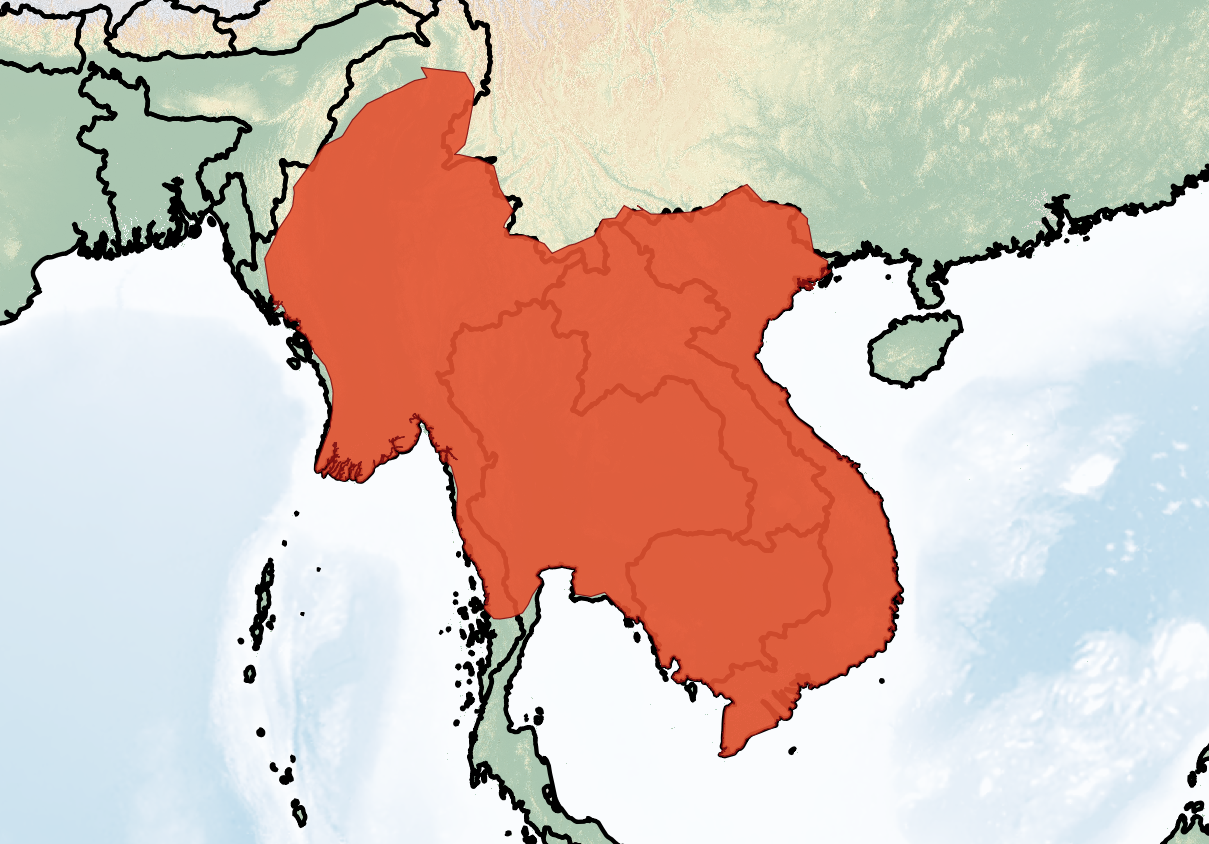

Species of horseshoe bat from Southeast Asia

Rhinolophus microglobosus is a species of horseshoe bat found in Southeast Asia.

== Taxonomy and etymology ==
It was described as a subspecies of the lesser brown horseshoe bat in 1998, with the trinomen Rhinolophus stheno microglobosus. The holotype was collected in Na Hang Nature Reserve in Vietnam in 1996. In 2008, Soisook et al. published that R. s. microglobosus should be considered a full species based on distinct morphology and echolocation characteristics. The species name "microglobosus" "refers to the size and shape of the median anterior rostral swellings which are considerably smaller than those of R. stheno."

== Description ==
Relative to other horseshoe bats, it is medium-sized. Its forearm length is 43.8–47.2 mm (1.72–1.86 in). Individuals weigh 9–9.5 g (0.32–0.34 oz). Its dorsal fur is bicolored, with the basal portions of the hairs yellowish-brown and the distal portions cinnamon-brown. Its ventral fur is paler in color. Its flight membranes are all dark brown.

== Range and habitat ==
It is found in several countries in Southeast Asia, including Cambodia, Laos, Myanmar, Thailand, and Vietnam.

== Conservation ==
As of 2017, it is evaluated as a least-concern species by the IUCN.
