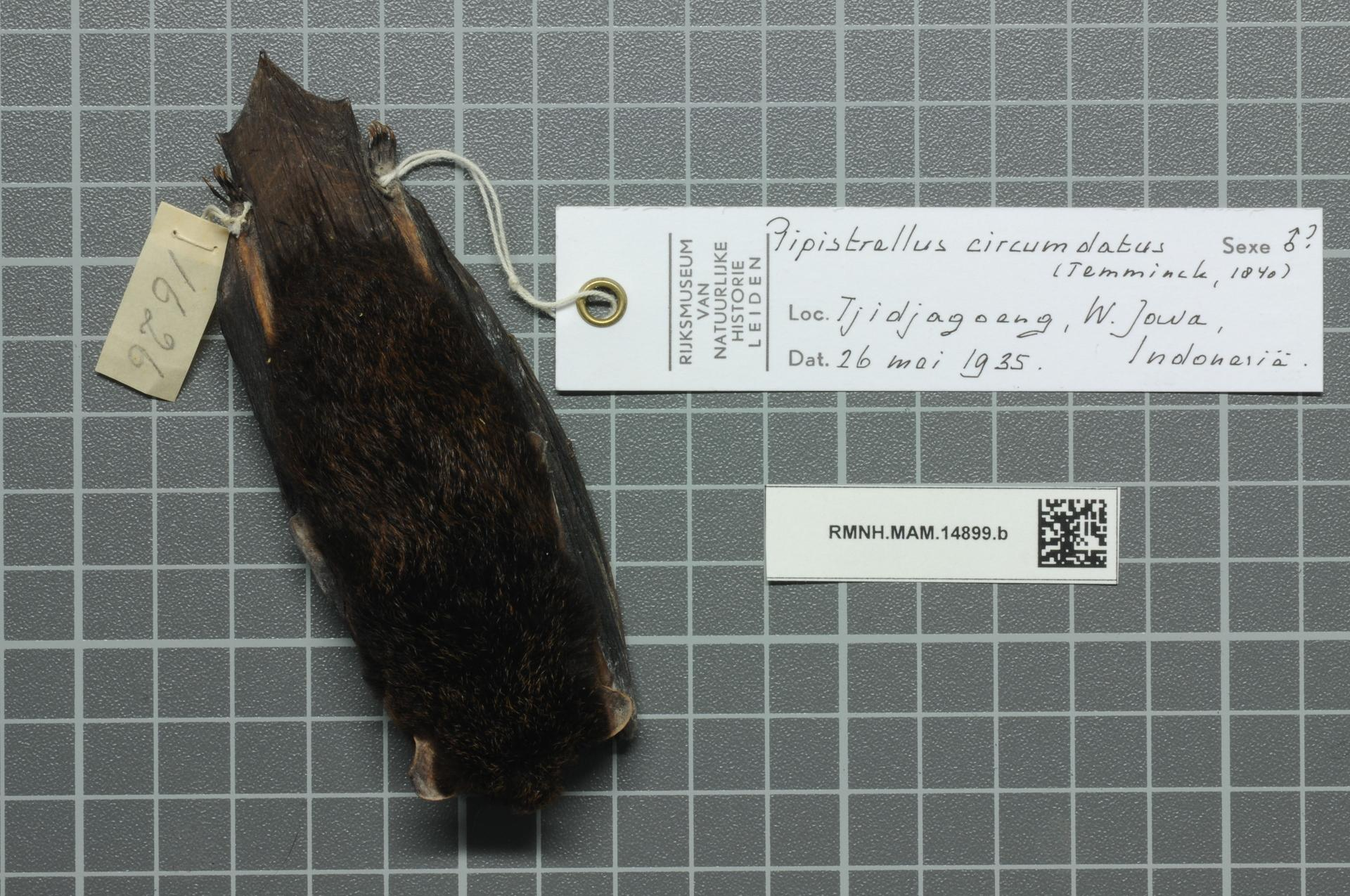

Conservation status
- Least Concern (IUCN 3.1)

Scientific classification
- Kingdom: Animalia
- Phylum: Chordata
- Class: Mammalia
- Order: Chiroptera
- Family: Vespertilionidae
- Genus: Arielulus
- Species: A. circumdatus

Binomial name
- Arielulus circumdatus (Temminck, 1840)
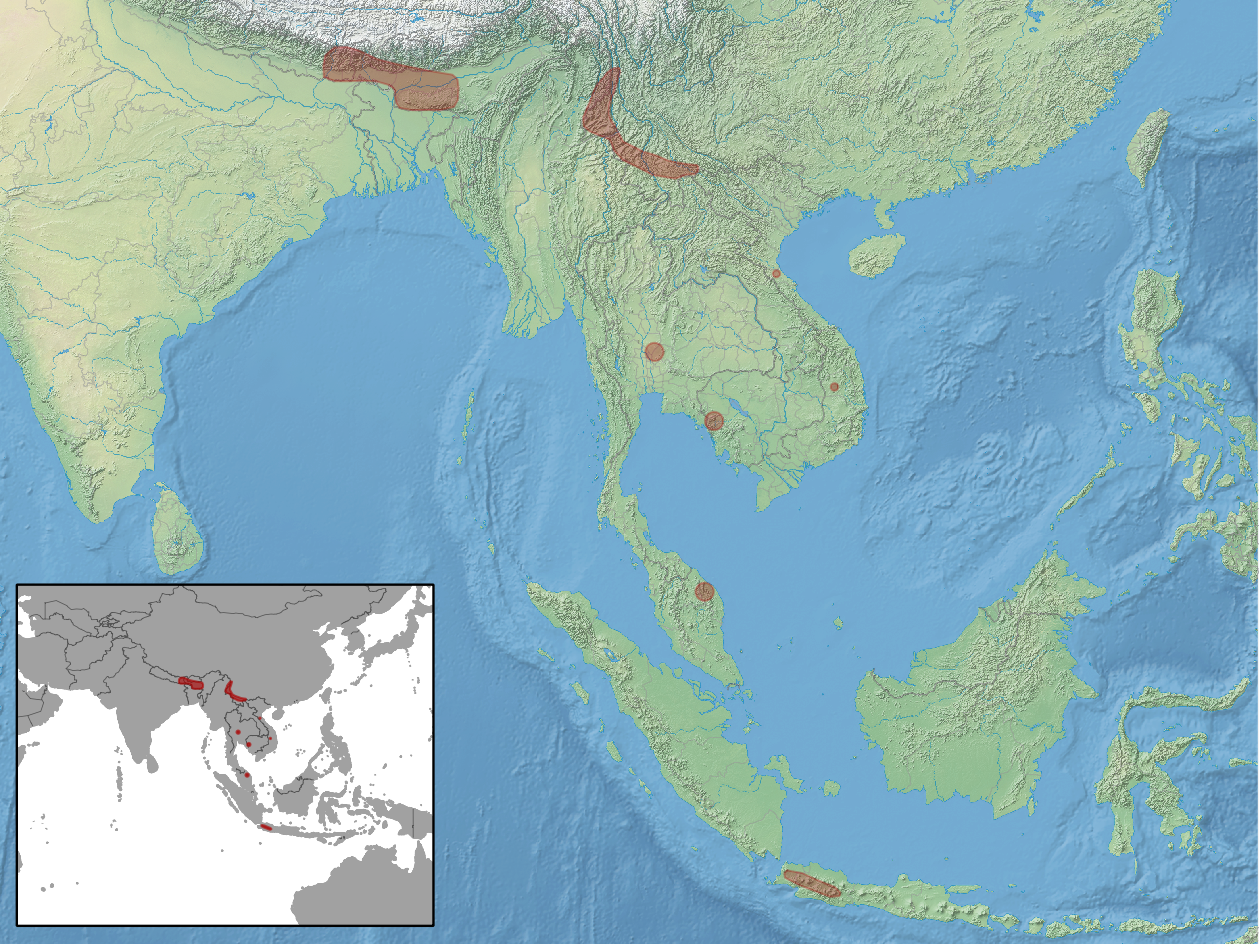

Synonyms
- Vespertilio circumdatus Temminck, 1840; Pipistrellus circumdatus (Temminck, 1840)

= Bronze sprite =

Species of bat

The bronze sprite (Arielulus circumdatus), also known as the black-gilded pipistrelle, is a species of vesper bat found in China, India, Myanmar, and Nepal.

== Taxonomy ==
The bronze sprite was described as a new species in 1840 by Dutch zoologist Coenraad Jacob Temminck, who placed it in the genus Vespertilio with a scientific name of Vespertilio circumdatus.

== Description ==
Its forearm length is 41–44 mm (1.6–1.7 in). The fur of its back is black with some hairs tipped in orange. Its belly fur is paler than its back and brown.

== Range and habitat ==
The bronze sprite is found in South and Southeast Asia, including the following countries: Cambodia, China, India, Indonesia, Malaysia, Myanmar, Nepal, Thailand, and Vietnam. It has been documented at a range of elevations from 1,300–2,100 m (4,300–6,900 ft) above sea level.

== Conservation ==
As of 2019, the bronze sprite is evaluated as a least-concern species by the IUCN. It meets the criteria for this designation due to its large geographic range, and thus, presumably large population. Additionally, it is not thought to be experiencing rapid population decline.
