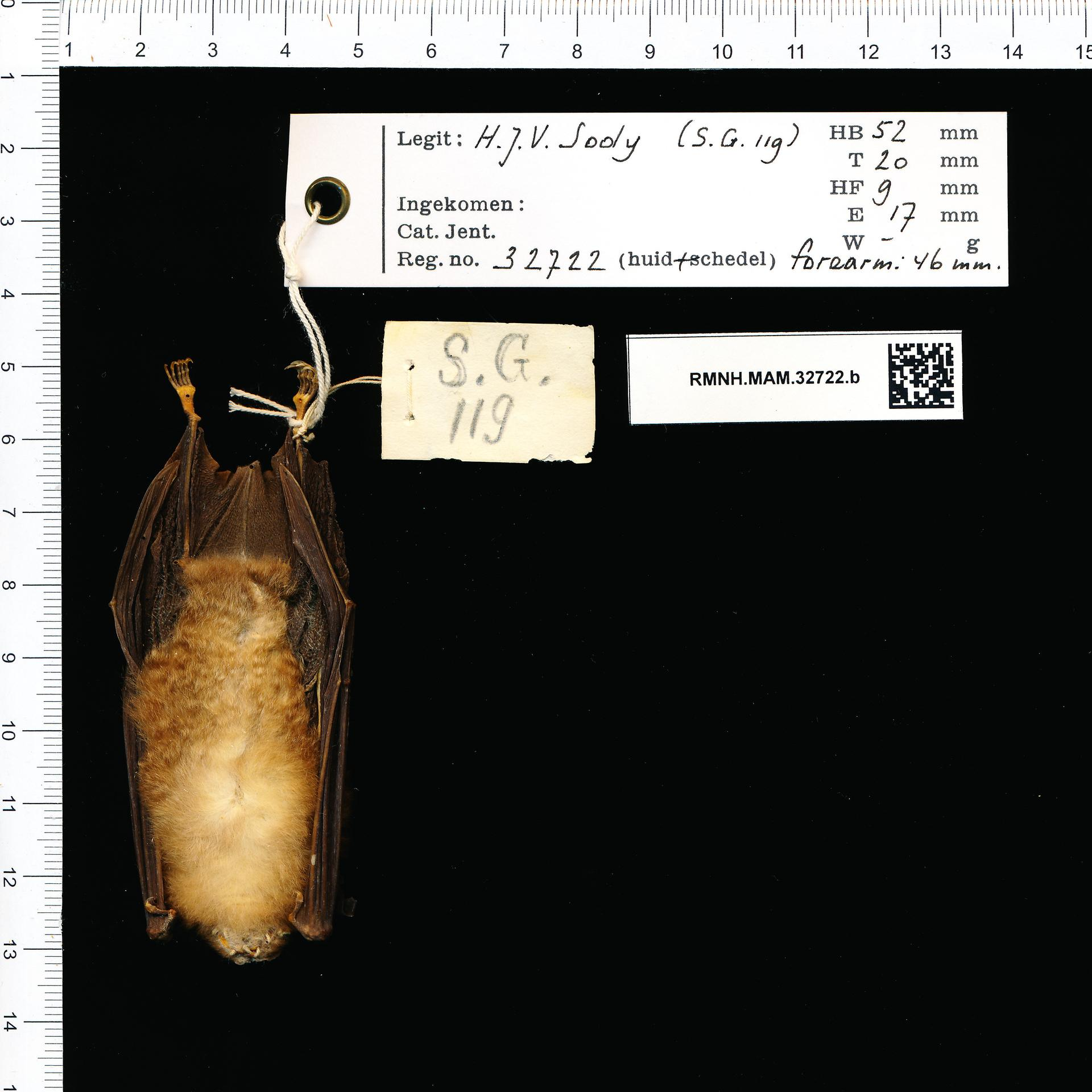

Conservation status
- Least Concern (IUCN 3.1)

Scientific classification
- Kingdom: Animalia
- Phylum: Chordata
- Class: Mammalia
- Order: Chiroptera
- Family: Rhinolophidae
- Genus: Rhinolophus
- Species: R. stheno

Binomial name
- Rhinolophus stheno K. Andersen, 1905
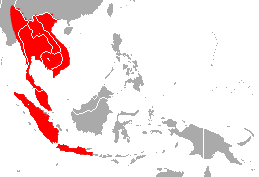
- Lesser brown horseshoe bat range

= Lesser brown horseshoe bat =

Species of bat

The lesser brown horseshoe bat (Rhinolophus stheno) is a species of bat in the family Rhinolophidae. It is found in China, Indonesia (on Java and Sumatra), Malaysia, Myanmar, Thailand, and Vietnam.

== Taxonomy ==
Rhinolophus stheno was first described by Knud Andersen in 1905, from a specimen collected by H. N. Ridley in Selangor, Malaysia. It was included in the megaphyllus group by Andersen, euryotis group of Rhinolophus by Bodgdanowicz in 1992, and then back in the megaphyllus group by Csorba et al. in 2003.

A subspecies, Rhinolophus stheno microglobosus, was described in 1998 by Gábor Csorba and Paulina Jenkins, but a 2008 analysis by Soisook et al. described it as a separate species.

== Description ==
R. stheno is a medium-sized bat, with a forearm length of about 45 millimetres (1.8 in) and a short tail. The back is grey to reddish-brown in color, while the undersides are a similar color but lighter. It is overall similar in appearance to R. malayanus. R. stheno can be distinguished by greater "inflation of the anterior median compartments of the rostrum", narrower post-orbital constriction, and proportions of the first and second finger bones on the third finger.

R. stheno's habitat includes forests, rubber plantations, and other agricultural zones. It roosts in caves. It has been found at elevations up to 1,700 metres (5,600 ft) above sea level. Pregnancies occur March to May, and lactation May to July.

It is listed as a species of least concern by the IUCN due to its likely large population and wide distribution. It is common in Thailand, and may be less common in other parts of its range.
