= Groove-toothed bat =

Groove-Toothed Bat

Conservation status
- Near Threatened (IUCN 3.1)

Scientific classification
- Kingdom: Animalia
- Phylum: Chordata
- Class: Mammalia
- Order: Chiroptera
- Family: Vespertilionidae
- Genus: Phoniscus
- Species: P. atrox

Binomial name
- Phoniscus atrox Miller, 1905
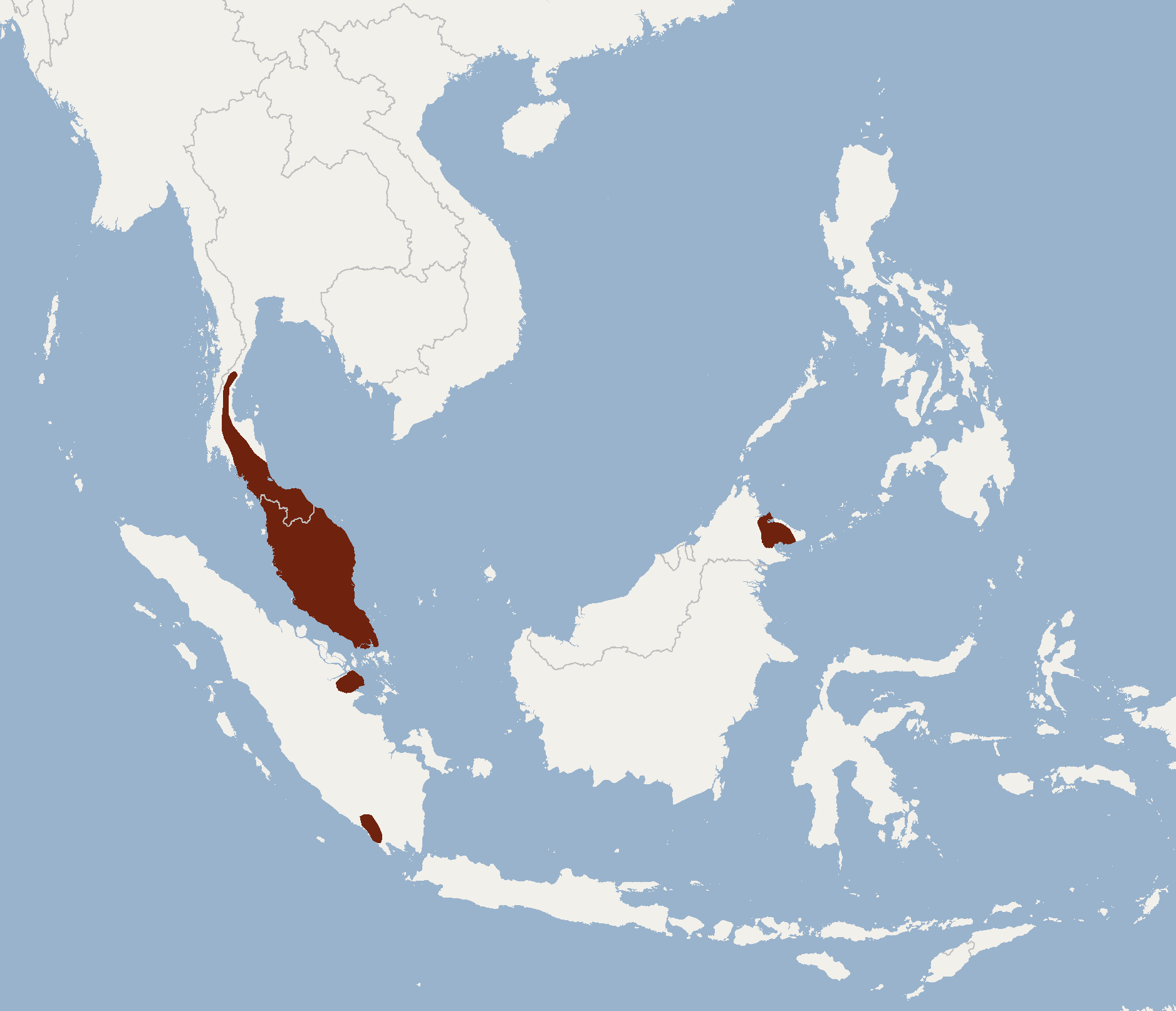

Synonyms
- Kerivoula atrox (Miller, 1905)

Species of bat

The groove-toothed bat (Phoniscus atrox) is a species of bat in the family Vespertilionidae, the vesper bats. It is native to Indonesia, Malaysia, and Thailand. It is an uncommon species that depends on forests for survival, and it is threatened by deforestation.
