= Social sprite =

Social pipistrelle

Conservation status
- Least Concern (IUCN 3.1)

Scientific classification
- Kingdom: Animalia
- Phylum: Chordata
- Class: Mammalia
- Order: Chiroptera
- Family: Vespertilionidae
- Genus: Arielulus
- Species: A. societatis

Binomial name
- Arielulus societatis Hill, 1972
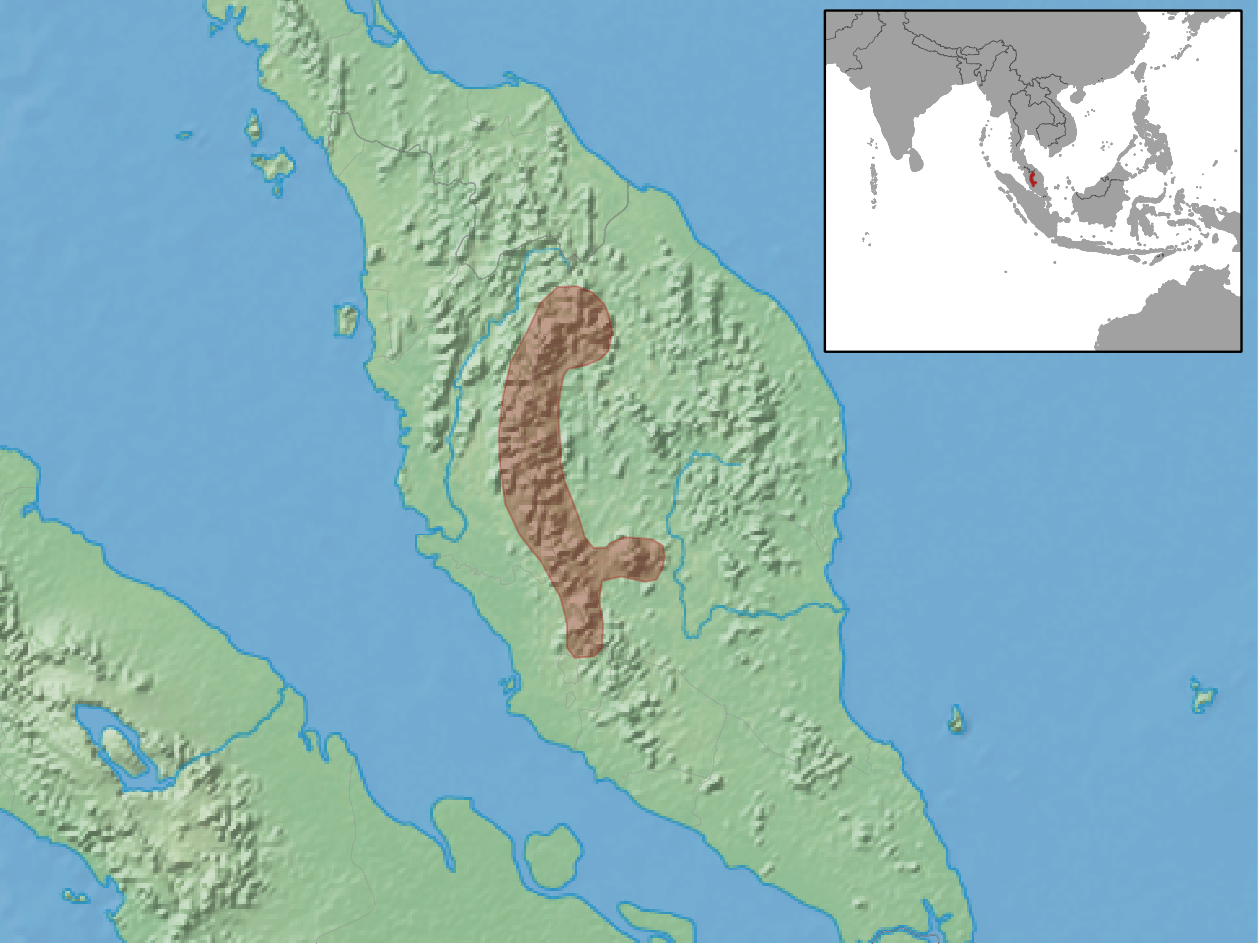

Synonyms
- Pipistrellus societatis Hill, 1972

Species of bat

The social sprite (Arielulus societatis), also known as the social pipistrelle, is a species of vesper bat that is found only on the Malay Peninsula.
