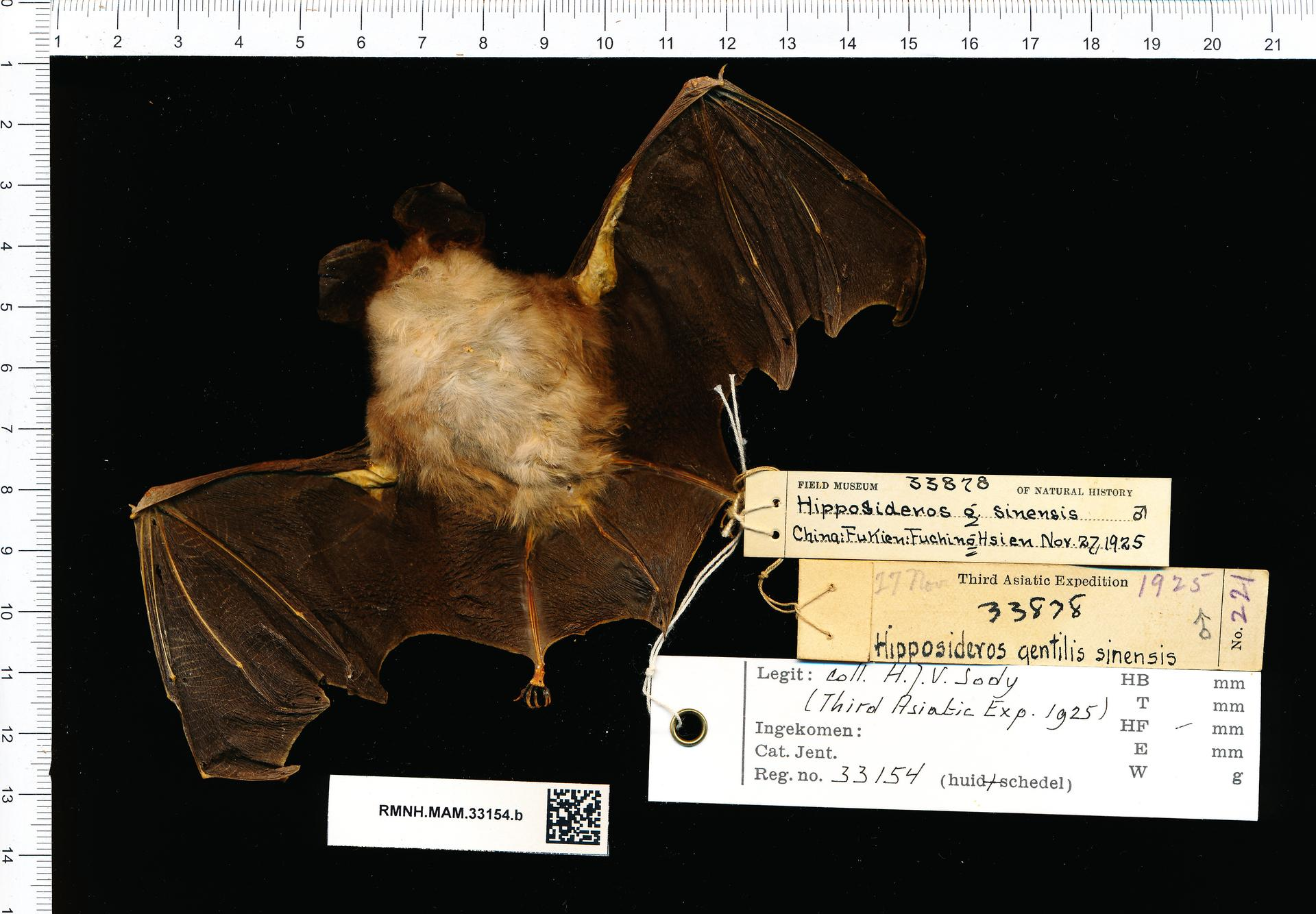

Conservation status
- Endangered (IUCN 3.1)

Scientific classification
- Kingdom: Animalia
- Phylum: Chordata
- Class: Mammalia
- Order: Chiroptera
- Family: Hipposideridae
- Genus: Hipposideros
- Species: H. pomona

Binomial name
- Hipposideros pomona Andersen, 1918

= Pomona roundleaf bat =

Species of bat

The Pomona roundleaf bat, Pomona leaf-nosed bat, or Andersen's leaf-nosed bat (Hipposideros pomona) is a species of bat in the family Hipposideridae that is endemic to India.

== Taxonomy ==
It was described as a new species in 1918 by Danish mammalogist Knud Andersen. The holotype had been collected in what was then the Coorg Province of India by G. C. Shortridge. The Vietnam leaf-nosed bat, Paracoelops megalotis, formerly known as its own species based on one specimen, is now recognized as synonymous with the pomona roundleaf bat. In 2012, researchers determined that all the features of P. megalotis match the pomona roundleaf bat. Their skulls and teeth were identical, and the P. megalotis specimen is indistinguishable from pomona roundleaf bat individuals. The Integrated Taxonomic Information System, responsible for managing taxonomy of species, no longer recognizes Paracoelops as a valid genus nor P. megalotis as a valid species.

== Description ==
Its forearm length is approximately 39–43 mm (1.5–1.7 in).

== Range and status ==
Some authors recognize H. gentilis as a species rather than as a subspecies of H. pomona. If H. gentilis is not included, H. pomona has a greatly restricted range, occurring in only 8–10 roosts in a 32–40 km^{2} (12–15 mi^{2}) area. As of 2020, it is evaluated as an endangered species by the IUCN.
