= Luard =

Luard is a surname, and may refer to:

- Arthur Luard (1861−1944), British cricketer
- Caroline Mary Luard (1850–1908), British murder victim
- Charles Luard (1867–1947), British army officer
- Constance Luard (1881−1955), British tennis player
- Edward Chauncey Luard (1856−1900), British planter and philatelist
- Elisabeth Luard (born 1942), British food writer
- Evan Luard (1926–1991), British politician
- Henry Luard (1825–1891), British antiquarian
- John Luard (1790–1875), British army officer
- Kate Luard (1872-1962), British nurse
- Lowes Dalbiac Luard (1872−1944), British painter
- Nicholas Luard (1937–2004), British writer
- Richard Luard (1827–1891), British Army lieutenant-general
- William Luard (1820–1910), British Royal Navy admiral

== See also ==
- Luard family
- Luard Road, a street in Hong Kong
- Luard Islands, an archipelago off the coast of Port Moresby, Papua New Guinea
