= Luard family =

English family of Huguenot origin

The Luard family is a prominent English family of Huguenot origin that is associated with Blyborough in Lincolnshire and Witham in Essex. Its members have included:

- Arthur John Hamilton Luard (1861−1944), English cricket player and army officer, great-nephew of John
- Bertram Luard-Selby (1853−1918), British organist and composer, nephew of John, cousin of Henry and Richard
- Caroline Mary Luard (née Hartley) (d. 1908), British murder victim, whose husband was a half-brother of Bertram, nephew of John, and cousin of Henry and Richard
- Charles Camac Luard (1867–1947), British army officer, son of Richard
- Constance Mary Luard (née Wilson) (1881−1955), British tennis player, whose husband was a nephew of Richard and cousin of Charles
- Edward Chauncey Luard (1856−1900), British planter and philatelist, nephew of Henry
- Henry Reynolds Luard (1828 – 1870), British Royal Engineer who was one of seven officers of the Royal Engineers, Columbia Detachment, which founded British Columbia as the Colony of British Columbia (1858–1866)
- Henry Richards Luard (1825–1891), British antiquarian, nephew of John, uncle of Edward, and cousin of Richard and Bertram
- John Luard (1790–1875), British army officer, first cousin once removed of William, father of Richard, grandfather of Lowes, uncle of Bertram and Henry, and great-uncle of Arthur
- Kate Evelyn Luard (1872-1962), British nurse, niece of William
- Lowes Dalbiac Luard (1872−1944), British painter, grandson of John
- Richard George Amherst Luard (1827–1891), British army officer, son of John, cousin of Henry and Bertram, and father of Charles
- William Garnham Luard (1820–1910), British naval officer, first cousin once removed of John, uncle of Kate

Other relatives included the scientist Alexander Luard Wollaston and the singer Sir Peter Neville Luard Pears (a grandson of Richard Luard).
