= Alexander Wollaston =

Alexander Wollaston may refer to:

- Sandy Wollaston (1875–1930), English medical doctor, ornithologist, botanist, climber and explorer
- Alexander Luard Wollaston (1804–1874), English amateur scientist
