= Thomson Road =

Thomson Road can refer to either:

- Thomson Road, Singapore
- Thomson Road, Hong Kong
