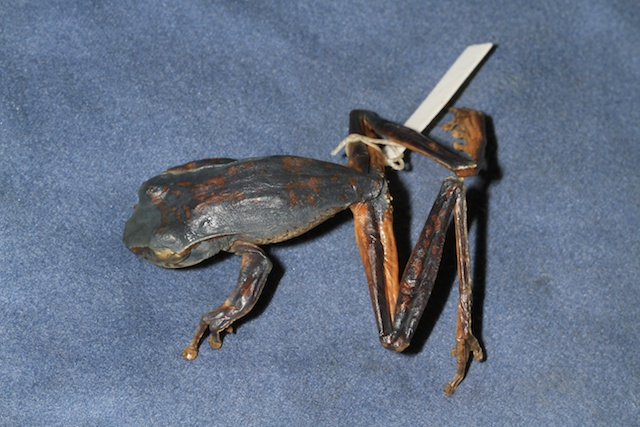
- Museum specimen holotype

Conservation status
- Least Concern (IUCN 3.1)

Scientific classification
- Kingdom: Animalia
- Phylum: Chordata
- Class: Amphibia
- Order: Anura
- Family: Pelodryadidae
- Genus: Amnihyla
- Species: A. wollastoni

Binomial name
- Amnihyla wollastoni (Boulenger, 1914)

Synonyms
- Litoria wollanstoni (Boulenger, 1914)

= Highland tree frog =

Species of amphibian

The Highland treefrog (Amnihyla wollastoni), or Wollaston's treefrog, is a species of frog in the subfamily Pelodryadinae, found in West New Guinea. Its natural habitats are subtropical or tropical moist lowland forests, subtropical or tropical moist montane forests, rivers, rural gardens, and heavily degraded former forests. It was named in honour of the British naturalist and explorer Sandy Wollaston, who collected the holotype on the Setakwa River, southern Dutch New Guinea in 1912–1913. The holotype is housed in the Natural History Museum, London, accession number BMNH 1947.2.23.59.
