= Bertram Luard-Selby =

English composer and cathedral organist

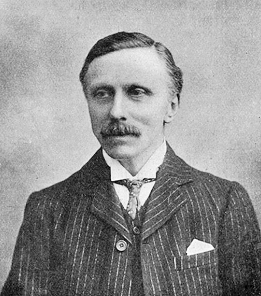
Luard-Selby in 1908

Bertram Luard-Selby (12 February 1853 – 26 December 1918) was an English composer and cathedral organist. As an organist, he served in Salisbury Cathedral and Rochester Cathedral. As a composer, he wrote prolifically for the church, the concert-hall and the theatre.

== Family ==
Luard-Selby was born at Ightham Mote, Kent, to Robert Luard-Selby (1800−1880) and his second wife Lewis Marianne Selby. His father was the brother of Lt.-Col. John Luard and the uncle of the antiquarian Henry Richards Luard and Lt.-Gen. Richard George Amherst Luard. His half-brother Charles was married to Caroline Mary Luard, the victim of an unsolved murder.

== Life and works ==
Luard-Selby studied the organ at the Leipzig Conservatoire under Carl Reinecke and was appointed organist at, successively, St. Barnabas, Marylebone, and Highgate School (1876); Salisbury Cathedral (1881); St John's Church, Torquay, 1884; and St. Barnabas, Pimlico, 1887. He was appointed organist of Rochester Cathedral on the death of the incumbent, John Hopkins, in 1900, and held the post until 1916, when he resigned to take up a post at Bradfield College. He was the musical editor of Hymns Ancient and Modern, published in 1904. He also gave chamber music concerts in London in the 1880s.

At the Three Choirs Festival of 1877, Luard-Selby's Kyrie Eleison was premiered at a concert together with two other novelties, Sullivan's In Memoriam and Brahms's German Requiem. The Musical Times said of Luard-Selby's work, "We failed to discover any originality of thought, but the writing throughout shows that its composer is an accomplished musician." He composed two school cantatas, The Waits of Bremen and A Castle in Spain; chamber music including two piano quintets; a piano quartet; three sonatas for violin and piano; and many songs and part-songs. His church music includes two settings of the Magnificat and Nunc dimittis, 16 anthems, and a number of pieces for the organ.

Among Luard-Selby's orchestral works were Village Suite, which premiered at the Henry Wood Proms in 1908, and An Idyll, described by The Manchester Guardian as "extremely tedious" in 1897 and as "picturesque" two years later. His other works include incidental music to Helena in Troas, a drama by John Todhunter and E. W. Godwin (London, 1886). He also wrote three operas: The Ring (1886) and Adela (produced in Nottingham in 1888), and a one-act comic opera for two characters, Weather or No, first produced at the Savoy Theatre in 1896 as a curtain-raiser for The Mikado. Both The Observer and The Times praised the music and the libretto of Weather or No and advised readers not to miss it. It was also popular in Germany and Austria as Das Wetterhäuschen.

Luard-Selby died in Brigg, Lincolnshire at the age of 65.

== Notes ==
Cultural offices
Preceded by John Elliot Richardson	Organist and Master of the Choristers of Salisbury Cathedral; 1881-1883	Succeeded by Charles Frederick South
Preceded by John Hopkins	Organist and Master of the Choristers of Rochester Cathedral; 1900-1916	Succeeded by Charles Hylton Stewart
