= Alexander Luard Wollaston =

Alexander Luad Wollaston
- Born: 14 June 1804; Battersea, London
- Died: 10 June 1874 (aged 69); Hollington, East Sussex
- Education: Gonville and Caius College, Cambridge (BA, MA)
- Spouse: Susanna Charlotte Morris (m. 1837)

Alexander Luard Wollaston FRS (14 June 1804 – 10 June 1874) was an amateur scientist.

The fourth son of George Hyde Wollaston (1765–1841) and Mary Anne Luard (aunt of Sir William Luard and John Luard), Wollaston was educated at Hackney and Harrow before matriculating on 15 March 1823 at St John's College, Cambridge and then migrating on 10 November 1821 to Gonville and Caius College, Cambridge. He graduated there B.A. 1826 and M.A. 1829. He qualified M.B. in 1829 but never practised medicine. He was elected F.R.S. in 1829. He studied chemistry and natural philosophy in Paris.

On 16 March 1837, at Ryde, he married Susanna Charlotte Morris (1807–1894) and had two sons and four daughters. The doctor and explorer Alexander Frederick Richmond Wollaston was his grandson.
