= St John's Church, Torquay =

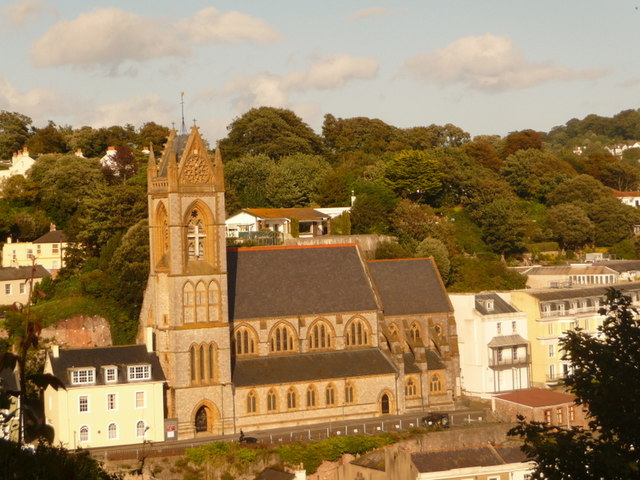
- St John's Church, Torquay

- Location within Devon
- 50°27′47″N 3°31′28″W
- OS grid reference: SX 91886 63653
- Location: Torquay
- Country: England
- Denomination: Church of England

History
- Dedication: Saint John the Apostle

Architecture
- Heritage designation: Grade I listed
- Designated: 20 November 1952
- Architect: George Edmund Street

Specifications
- Length: 129 feet (39 m)
- Width: 52 feet (16 m)
- Height: 56 feet (17 m)

Administration
- Province: Canterbury
- Diocese: Exeter
- Archdeaconry: Totnes
- Deanery: Torbay
- Parish: Torquay

The Church of St John the Apostle, Torquay, is a Grade I listed parish church in the Church of England Diocese of Exeter on Montpellier Road in Torquay, Devon.

== History ==
The church started in 1823 as a chapel-of-ease to the parish church at Tormoham. The current building was designed by George Edmund Street and built between 1861 and 1873. The chancel was built first by Wall and Hook of Brunscomb, Gloucester at a cost of £4,000. The chancel was consecrated by the Lord Bishop of Jamaica, the Rt Revd Aubrey Spencer, acting for the diocesan bishop, on 8 November 1864. It contained carving by Thomas Earp and mosaic work by Antonio Salviati.

The north aisle was completed next and opened in 1866. Construction on the nave and south aisle began in 1870 and it opened on 2 April 1871.

The west tower was completed in 1884–85 at a cost of £2,000 to the designs of Arthur Edmund Street and the contractor being a Mr Chubb of Torquay. Special services were held on 30 April 1885 to mark the completion of the tower. A new bell was dedicated on 7 October 1885 which was cast in E flat by Warner and Son of London with a weight of nearly 17 cwt.

The lady chapel was decorated between 1888 and 1890 by John Dando Sedding. The chapel was divided from the chancel and aisle by iron grills, and approached by a polished Torquay marble step was the ornate altar and reredos. New seating of oak was placed on oak platforms and the floor. The fronts and back were carved and traceried, and the ends of the seats had fleur de lis termination, and the sides had shields with sunken carved panels with scenes from The Passion. The work was carried out by Harry Hems of Longbrook Street, Exeter.

== Incumbents ==
- James Yonge 1825 - 1828
- Algernon Grenfell 1828 - 1831
- Charles Lane 1831 - 1837
- William George Parks Smith 1837 - 1870
- Charles Edward Ricketts Robinson 1870 - 1881
- Harry William Hitchcock 1881 - 1886
- Basil Reginald Airy 1886 - 1924 (formerly vicar of Whitwell, Yorkshire)
- Robert James Edward Boggis 1924 - 1944
- Sir (Arthur) Patrick Ferguson Davie, 5th Baronet 1945 - 1948
- J. S. Sproule 1948 -
- Anthony T. Rouse c. 1957
- W. H. Dormor c. 1862

== Organ ==
A temporary organ was acquired from Dicker of Exeter when the church opened, but when the nave was completed a new organ was built in 1872 by William Hill & Sons. The pipe organ has three manuals and pedals, with 47 speaking stops. A specification of the organ can be found in the National Pipe Organ Register.

=== Organists ===
- Mr Barnes 1832
- Mr J. Gedye 1841 - 1846
- Mr Dewe 1847 - 1848
- Mr J. Vinning 1848 - 1849
- Charles Fowler 1849 - 1855
- William F. Fry 1855 - 1857
- Thomas Lloyd Fowler 1858 - 1858
- John Horth Deane 1858 - 1858
- W. B. Wray 1858 - 1859
- Thomas Brooks 1859 - 1864
- John Abram 1864 - 1865
- Robert W. Pringle 1865 - 1866
- Mark Bradley 1866
- Wilmina Augusta Parks Smith 1867 - 1870
- Michael Gwyn Rice 1871 - 1873
- Thomas Roylands Smith 1873 - 1876
- Charles Banson 1876 - 1879
- Henry Ditton-Newman 1879 - 1884
- Bertram Luard-Selby 1884 - 1887 (afterwards organist of St Barnabas’ Church, Pimlico)
- Thomas Henry Webb 1887
- Thomas William Noble 1887 - 1905
- Oliver Oldham Brooksbank 1905 - 1912
- Harold Rhodes 1912 - 1928 (afterwards organist of Coventry Cathedral)
- Vernon Sydney Read 1928 - 1947 (formerly organist of St Mary's Church, Nottingham, afterwards organist of St Matthias’ Church, Torquay)
- Francis Crute 1947 - 1953
- Donald Frederick Hunt 1954 - 1957 (afterwards organist at Leeds Parish Church, then Worcester Cathedral)
- Frederick C. Fea 1957 - 1959 (formerly organist of Gainsborough Parish Church, afterwards organist of Sherborne Abbey)
