= Alexander MacDonald Thomson =

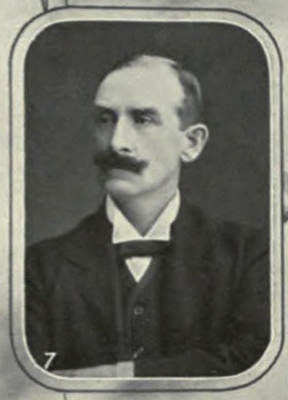
Alexander MacDonald Thomson

The Hon. Alexander MacDonald Thomson (Chinese: 譚臣) (27 September 1863 – 28 July 1924) was a Scottish civil engineer who served as Colonial Treasurer of Hong Kong from 1899 to 1918.

Thomson was born in Turriff, Aberdeenshire, Scotland, in 1863 to John Thomson and his wife, Isabella Macdonald.

Thomson lived first in India, where he joined the Freemasons. He first appeared in colonial service in 1887 in a lowly capacity. By July 1898, he was Acting Colonial Treasurer and Collector of Stamp Revenue and he stood in for a few months as Acting Colonial Secretary for Sir Henry May in 1909, then twice more in 1910 and 1912. When Thomson retired in 1918, on a pension of HK$4,200, he was Colonial Treasurer.

Thomson died at Mt Zion Hospital in San Francisco in 1924 of cancer of the esophagus and pancreas. He had been living in nearby San Mateo, California.

Thomson Road, Hong Kong is named after him.
