= Wollaston's roundleaf bat =

Conservation status
- Least Concern (IUCN 3.1)

Scientific classification
- Kingdom: Animalia
- Phylum: Chordata
- Class: Mammalia
- Order: Chiroptera
- Family: Hipposideridae
- Genus: Macronycteris
- Species: H. wollastoni

Binomial name
- Hipposideros wollastoni Thomas, 1913
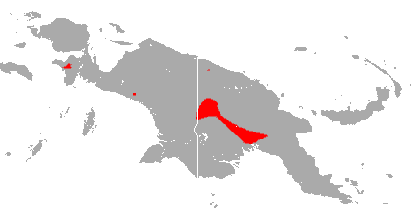
- Wollaston's roundleaf bat range

Species of bat

Wollaston's roundleaf bat (Hipposideros wollastoni) is a species of bat in the family Hipposideridae. It is found in West Papua, Indonesia and Papua New Guinea. It was named after the explorer Sandy Wollaston.

== Taxonomy and etymology ==
It was described as a new species in 1913 by British zoologist Oldfield Thomas. The eponym for the species name "wollastoni" is A. F. R. Wollaston. The holotype used to describe this species was collected during one of Wollaston's expeditions to New Guinea.

== Description ==
In his initial description of the species, Thomas noted that it was similar in appearance to the Fly River roundleaf bat, Hipposideros muscinus. It differs from the Fly River roundleaf bat in that its posterior nose-leaf has a "peculiar duplication" behind it. Its forearm length is approximately 44 mm (1.7 in) long. Its head and body is 45 mm (1.8 in), while its tail is 27 mm (1.1 in) long. Its ears are 15 mm (0.59 in) long and 13 mm (0.51 in) wide.

== Range and status ==
This species is only known from the island of New Guinea, in both Indonesia and Papua New Guinea. It has been documented from 30–2,440 m (98–8,005 ft) above sea level. It has been found in montane forests, oak forests, and secondary forests.

It is currently evaluated as least concern by the IUCN—its lowest conservation priority.
