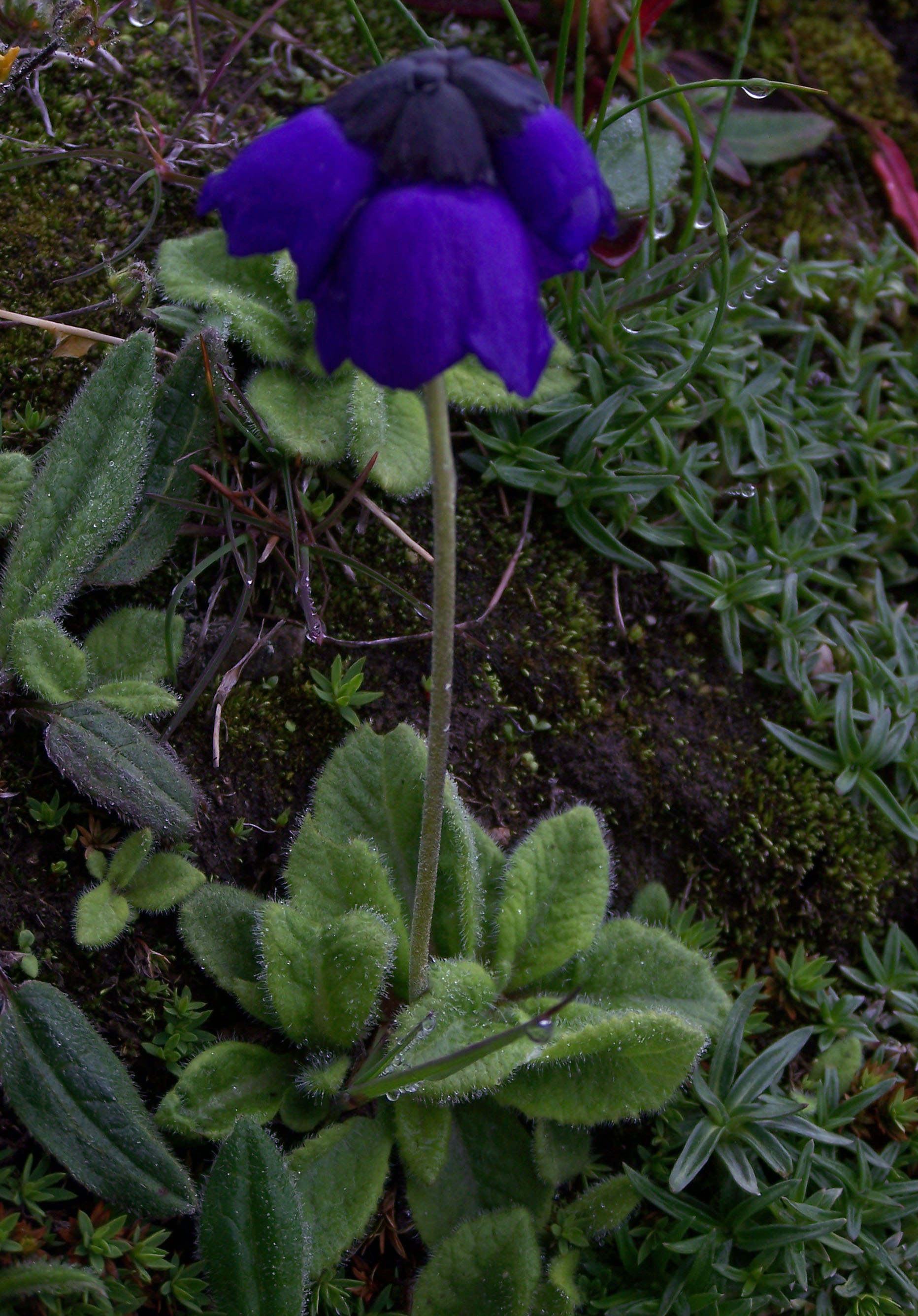

Scientific classification
- Kingdom: Plantae
- Clade: Tracheophytes
- Clade: Angiosperms
- Clade: Eudicots
- Clade: Asterids
- Order: Ericales
- Family: Primulaceae
- Genus: Primula
- Species: P. wollastonii

Binomial name
- Primula wollastonii Balf.f.

= Primula wollastonii =

Species of flowering plant

Primula wollastonii, also known as Wollaston's primrose, is a species of flowering plant within the genus Primula and family Primulaceae. The species was first discovered and collected by A. F. Wollaston during an expedition to Mount Everest in 1921. The plant would later be scientifically described by Scottish botanist Isaac Bayley Balfour, who named the species P. Wollastonii after a request from Wollaston who had first discovered it.

== Description ==
Primula wollastonii is a perennial plant, which possesses a basal rosette of leaves and bell-shaped flowers. It forms flattened mats of foliage and produces a slender stem bearing a cluster of blooms. The species has a chromosome count of 2n = 20.

=== Leaves ===
The leaves of Primula wollastonii are arranged in a rosette formation from the base of the plant. Leaves are characterized by their oblanceolate to obovate shape, measuring between 1.5 and 5 cm in length and 1 to 2.5 cm in width. The leaf blades are covered in multicellular white hairs, and the undersides may appear efarinose or have a white farinose coating. The petioles, if present, are either indistinct or up to one-third the length of the leaf blade, and they feature broad wings. The base of the leaf is attenuate, while the margin can range from irregularly remote dentate to crenate, and the apex is rounded.

=== Flowers ===
Primula wollastonii possesses nodding and heterostylous flowers, displaying dark purple to bright blue hues. The inflorescence consists of capitula containing from two to six flowers. Blooms are supported on a flowering stem ranging from 12 to 20 cm tall. The flowers have a cup-shaped calyx, which may be green or dark purple and measures between 5 and 8.5 mm in length. The calyx is glandular puberulous or sparsely farinose and divided to approximately the middle into ovate lobes. The corolla is campanulate and measures 1.8 to 2.5 cm in length. The basal cylindrical portion of the corolla tube is nearly as long as the calyx and abruptly widens towards the top. The corolla limb reaches 1.5 to 2 cm, featuring broadly ovate lobes with entire margins and obtuse to acute apices.

There are two forms of flowers present in the species: pin and thrum. In pin flowers, the stamens are positioned approximately 3 mm above the base of the corolla tube, while in thrum flowers, the stamens are located at the mouth of the basal cylindrical portion of the tube. The styles also differ in length, with pin flowers having a style nearly as long as the calyx, whereas thrum flowers have a style measuring 1 to 2 mm. The flowering period occurs in June.

=== Fruit and seeds ===
Following successful pollination, P. wollastonii develops subglobose capsules that are roughly the same length as the calyx.

== Distribution and habitat ==
Primula wollastonii is primarily distributed within the Himalayan region of Asia, specifically native to Nepal and Tibet. The species inhabits the subalpine and subarctic zone, where it can be found growing on alpine meadows, cliff faces and steep earth slopes. The plant can also be encountered growing within low alpine pastures that are grazed by cattle, sheep and goats. P. wollastonii usually grows in elevated mountainous habitat between 3600 and 5500 meters above sea level.
