= Blyborough =

Village and civil parish in the West Lindsey district of Lincolnshire, England

Coordinates: 53.439445°N 0.597565°W

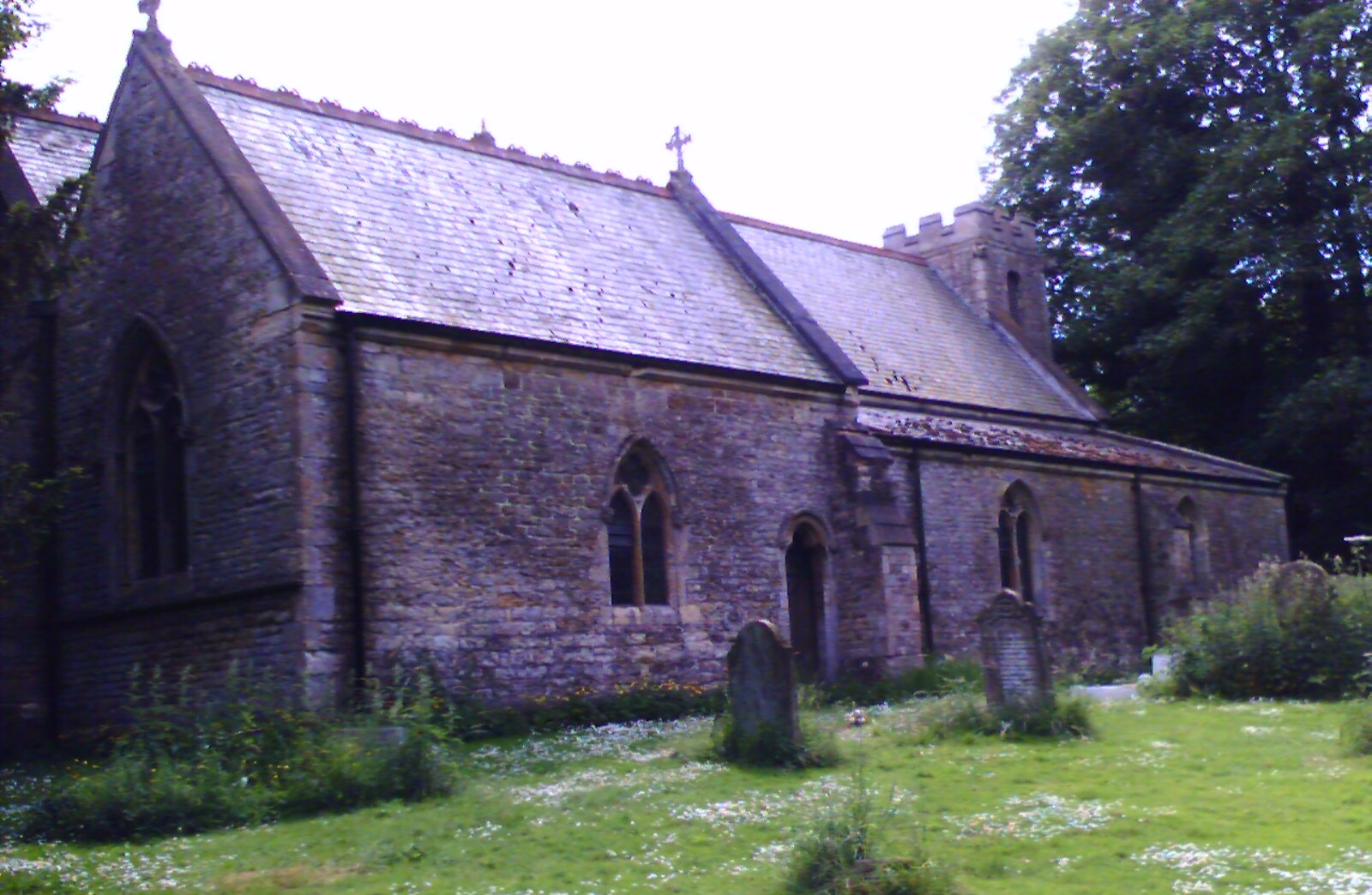
- Church of St Alkmund, Blyborough

- Location within Lincolnshire
- Population: 115 (2011)
- OS grid reference: SK932945
  - London: 140 mi (230 km) SSE
- Unitary authority: West Lindsey
- Ceremonial county: Lincolnshire
- Region: East Midlands
- Country: England
- Sovereign state: United Kingdom
- Post town: Gainsborough
- Postcode district: DN21
- Police: Lincolnshire
- Fire: Lincolnshire
- Ambulance: East Midlands
- UK Parliament: Gainsborough

Blyborough is a village and civil parish in the West Lindsey district of Lincolnshire, England. The population of the civil parish at the 2011 census was 115. It lies on the B1398 road, 9 miles (14 km) east from Gainsborough, 16 miles (26 km) north from Lincoln and 3 miles (5 km) south from Kirton Lindsey.

Blyborough's Grade I listed Anglican parish church is dedicated to the Anglo-Saxon saint and martyr, Alkmund of Derby. Built in the early 13th century, it was partially rebuilt in 1877 by James Fowler.

Two Grade II listed village buildings are Blyborough Grange Farmhouse and Blyborough Hall. The hall was built in the early 18th century and was for many generations the home of the Luard family, who acquired their wealth through sugar plantations in the West Indies.
