= Luard Islands =

Coordinates: 7°43′N 147°38′E

The Luard Islands form an archipelago off the coast of Port Moresby, Papua New Guinea. The wooded islands' height range from 113 ft (34 m) to 254 ft (77 m). They are in the region of Morobe and were named after Admiral (then Captain) Sir William Luard.
