= Charles Luard =

British Army officer (1867–1947)

Major-General Charles Luard CB CMG
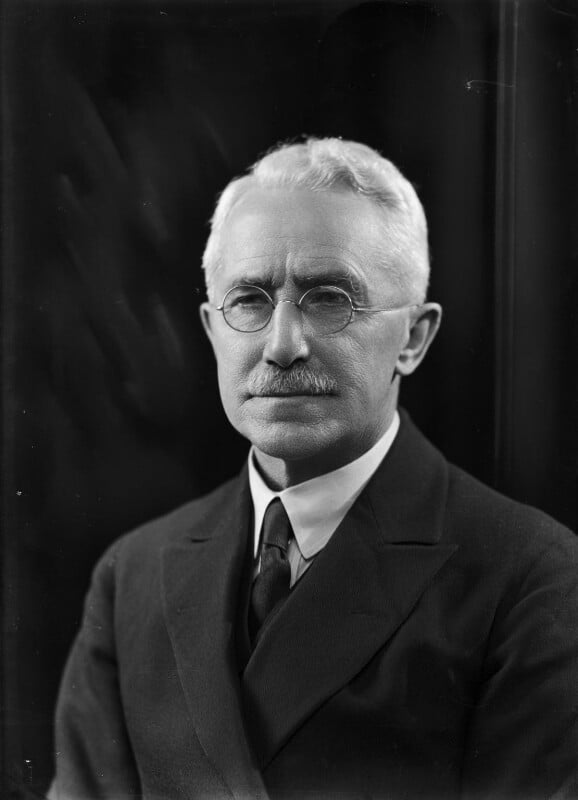
- Luard in 1934
- Born: 14 September 1867; Herstmonceux, Sussex
- Died: 28 June 1947 (aged 79); Yateley, Hampshire
- Military career
- Allegiance: United Kingdom
- Branch: British Army
- Rank: Major-General
- Commands: Commander of British Troops in South China
- Conflicts: Second Boer War; World War I
- Awards: Companion of the Order of the Bath; Companion of the Order of St Michael and St George

Major-General Charles Camac Luard, CB, CMG (14 September 1867 – 28 June 1947) was Commander of British Troops in South China.

== Military career ==
Fourth in a line of British army officers, and born the son of Richard Luard and educated at Clifton College, Luard graduated from the Royal Military College of Canada and was commissioned as a lieutenant in the Durham Light Infantry of the British Army on 2 September 1885. He served as an Assistant Superintendent of Army Signalling in the Zhob Field Force in 1890, and was promoted captain on 13 February 1895.

In late December 1901 he was placed in command of the Burma Mounted Infantry serving in the Second Boer War in South Africa, with the local rank of major whilst in command. He was mentioned in despatches (dated 8 April 1902) and received a brevet promotion as major in the South African Honours list published on 26 June 1902. Following the end of the war, he left South Africa on the SS Kildonan Castle, which arrived at Southampton in October 1902.

He later served in World War I, being promoted in February 1916 to colonel, commanding a brigade in India followed by 9th Infantry Brigade and was then deployed as part of the Mesopotamian Expeditionary Force and then the Egyptian Expeditionary Force.

After the war he again became a Brigade Commander in India and moved on to be Commander of British Troops in South China in 1925: he retired in 1929.

== Cricket ==
He was a keen cricketer and played for the Europeans cricket team and Bombay in India, playing four first-class matches in the 1892/3 and 1898/9 seasons.

== Memory ==
Luard Road in Wan Chai on Hong Kong Island was named after him.

Military offices
| Preceded by Sir John Fowler | Commander of British Troops in South China; 1925–1929 | Succeeded by James Sandilands |
