= Arthur Luard =

English cricketer and British Army officer

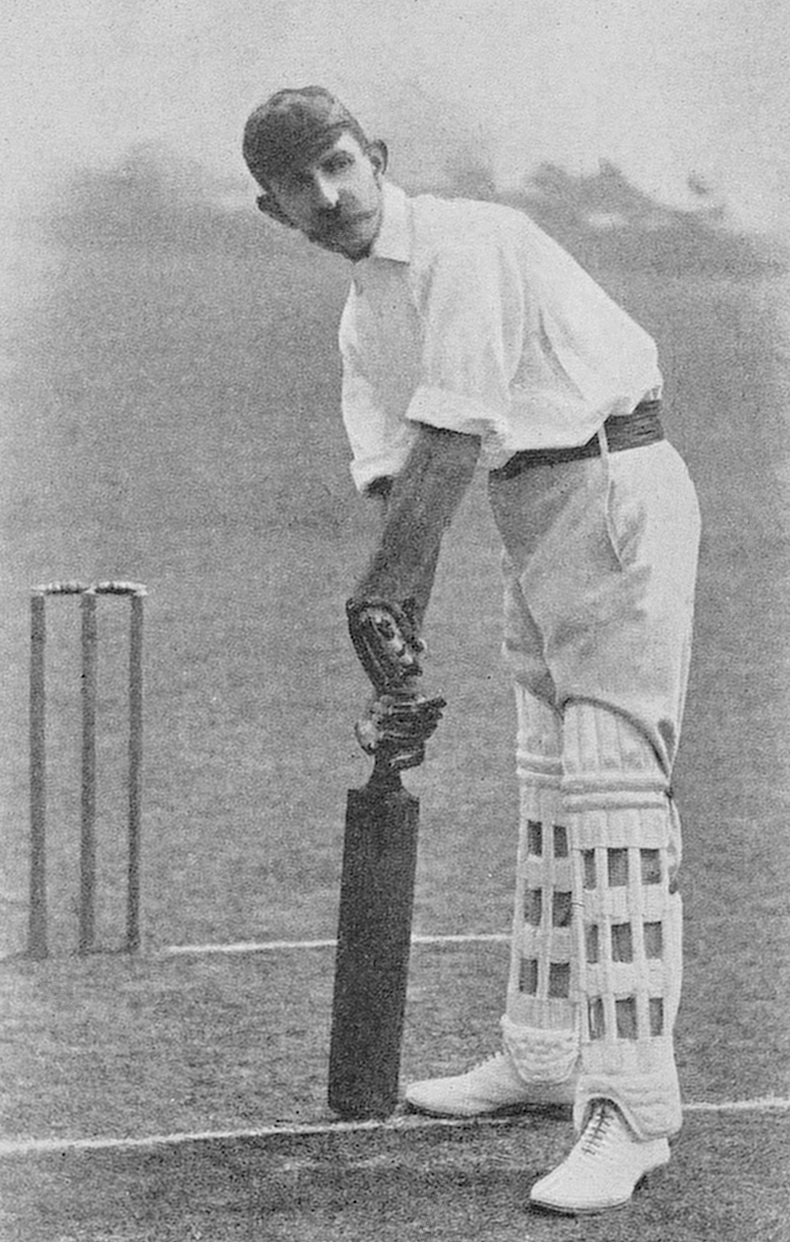
- Arthur Luard c. 1896

Personal information
- Full name: Arthur John Hamilton Luard
- Born: 3 September 1861; Waltair, Madras Presidency, British India
- Died: 22 May 1944 (aged 82); Guildford, Surrey, England
- Batting: Right-handed

Domestic team information
- Years: Team
- 1893–1896: Gloucestershire
- 1893: Marylebone Cricket Club
- 1897: Hampshire
- 1907: Gloucestershire

Career statistics
Competition	First-class
Matches	75
Runs scored	1,218
Batting average	13.53
100s/50s	–/4
Top score	75*
Catches/stumpings	25/–
- Source: Cricinfo, 17 February 2010

Arthur John Hamilton Luard DSO (3 September 1861 — 22 May 1944) was an English first-class cricketer and an officer in the British Army.

== Early life and military career ==
Luard was born at British India in Waltair in September 1861, the son of Colonel George Francis Luard (a nephew of Lieutenant Colonel John Luard) and Jane Hamilton, daughter of Lieutenant Colonel Johnstone Hamilton. He was educated in England at Denstone College, before attending the Royal Military College, Sandhurst. He was commissioned into the Norfolk Regiment, later the Royal Norfolk Regiment, as a lieutenant in May 1882, and saw action in the Burma Expedition from 1885. He was promoted to captain in May 1889, and was seconded to the staff in April 1899, where he held the appointment of superintendent of gymnasia at Portsmouth until January 1900.

With the beginning of the Second Boer War in October 1899, he went with his regiment to South Africa to serve in the war from 1900 to 1902. While there, he was wounded in action near Brandfort in March 1900, before serving as a deputy assistant adjutant general (DAAG) under the military governor of Johannesburg. He was promoted to major in September 1900, and was mentioned in dispatches in September 1901. During the course of the conflict, he was awarded two medals and created a Companion of the Distinguished Service Order (DSO) in the same month in which he was mentioned in despatches.

Several years after the conclusion of the war, he was promoted to lieutenant colonel in September 1908, and colonel following in April 1912. Luard retired from active service that September.

== Cricket career ==
With his family having close connections to Cheltenham, Luard made his debut in first-class cricket for Gloucestershire against Kent at Bristol in the 1892 County Championship, establishing himself in the Gloucestershire eleven that season with thirteen appearances. In his opening match of the 1893 season, Luard played for the Marylebone Cricket Club (MCC) against Yorkshire, and made a second appearance for the MCC later in the season against Kent. For Gloucestershire in 1893, he made a further fifteen appearances. He featured with less regularity in 1894, 1895 and 1896, making four, six and four appearances respectively. From his debut in 1892 through to 1896, he scored 1,118 runs for Gloucestershire from 42 matches, making four half centuries with a highest score of 75 not out.

The following season, Luard appeared in five first-class matches for Hampshire in the 1897 County Championship, scoring 60 runs with a highest score of 18. Ten years later, he made a further three first-class appearances for Gloucestershire in the County Championship, though he scored just 22 runs in these matches. Luard died at Guildford in May 1944.
