= Thomson Road, Hong Kong =

Road in Hong Kong

Coordinates: 22.27707°N 114.17092°E

Vintage nameplate affixed to the wall of the Hennessy Road Government Primary School

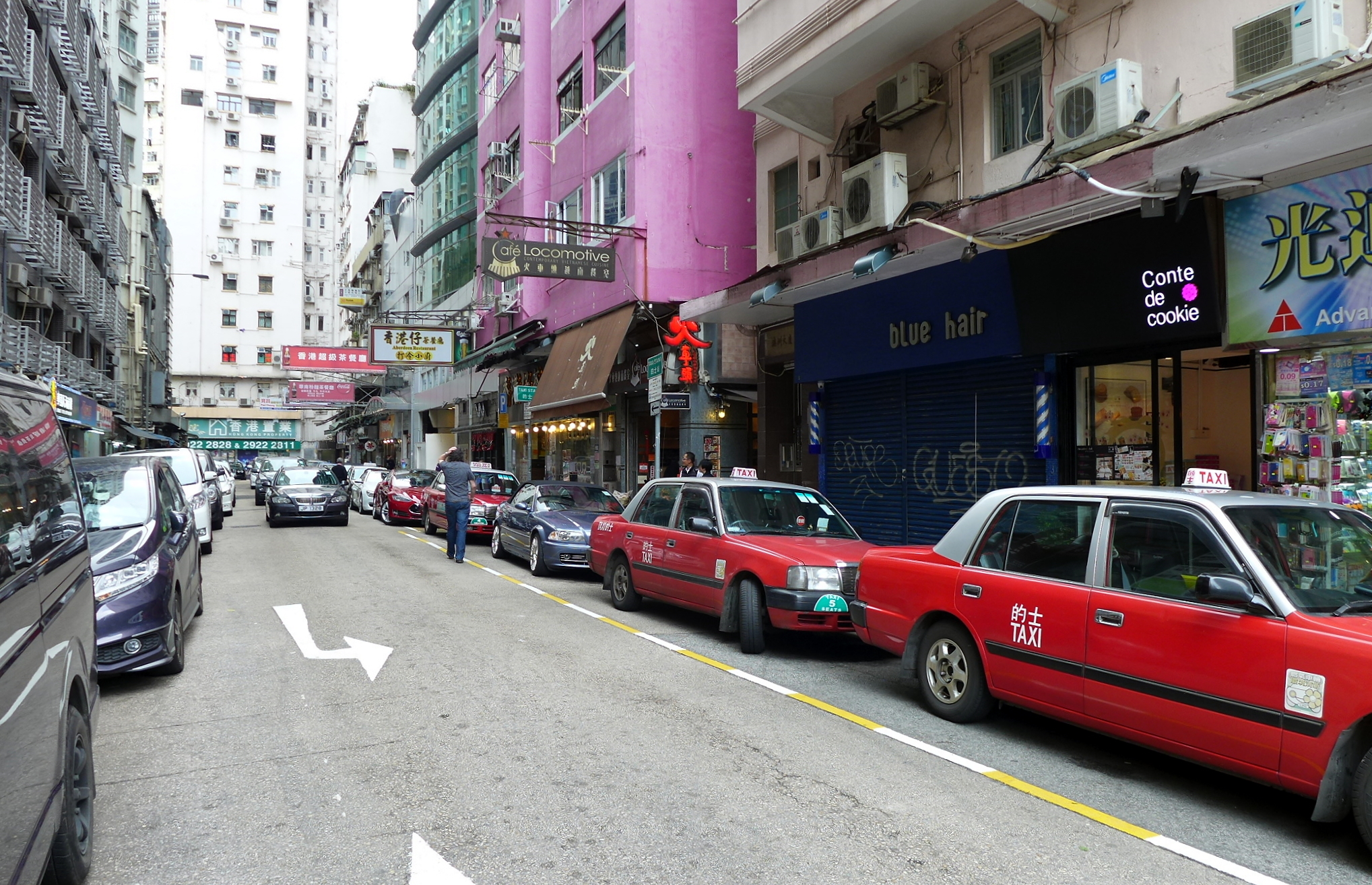
The western section of Thomson Road, as seen from the junction with Luard Road in 2016

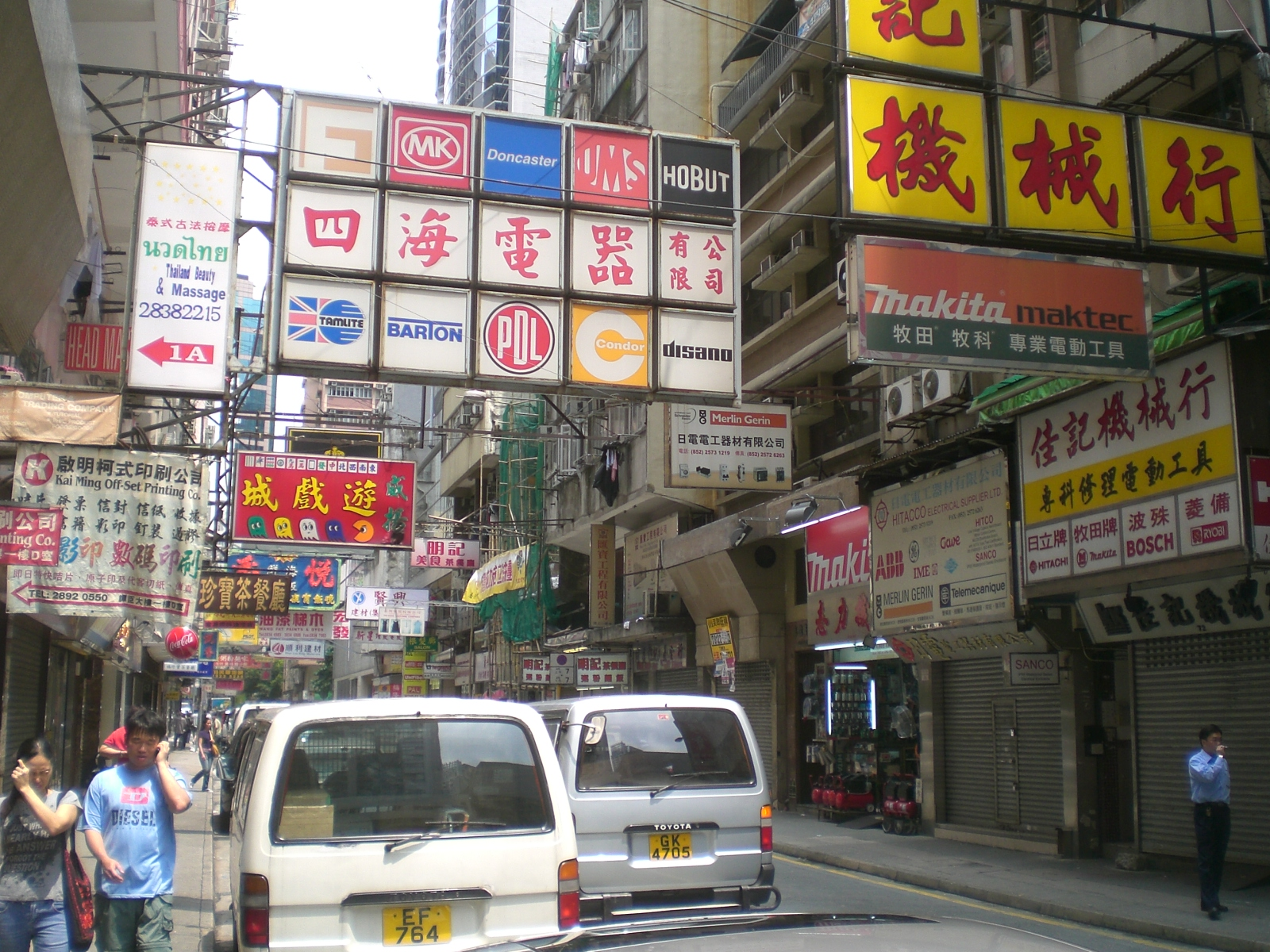
The start of the eastern section of Thomson Road, as seen from the corner of O'Brien Road in 2008

Thomson Road (Chinese: 譚臣道; Jyutping: taam4 san4 dou6) is a road in Wan Chai, Hong Kong Island. It was named on 30 October 1931 after Alexander MacDonald Thomson, who held the position of Colonial Treasurer from 1899 to 1918.

Thomson Road was originally a continuous thoroughfare which ran parallel to Johnston Road, but the construction of the Southorn Playground in 1932 divided it into the east and west sections which were no longer connected to each other.

The western section starts from Johnston Road on the corner of Newman House, near Luen Fat Street, and ends at the junction with Luard Road. The eastern section starts from the northern tip of O'Brien Road (where the two roads merge at the corner) and crosses Fleming Road before rejoining Johnston Road next to the Hennessy Road Government Primary School.

Both sections of Thomson Road are one-way only, with the result that the eastern section is solely accessible to traffic via O'Brien Road.

== Name ==
The name of the road was gazetted in October 1931. The Hon. Alexander MacDonald Thomson first appeared in colonial service in 1887 in a lowly capacity. By July 1898, he was Acting Colonial Treasurer and Collector of Stamp Revenue, and stood in for a few months as Acting Colonial Secretary for Sir Henry May in 1909, and twice more in 1910 and 1912. By the time Thomson retired in 1918, he had advanced to the position of Colonial Treasurer.

== See also ==
- List of streets and roads in Hong Kong
