= Edward Chauncey Luard =

British planter

- Born: 1856
- Died: 22 September 1900 (aged 43–44); Strathleven, Dumbarton, Scotland
- Occupation: Planter
- Known for: Campaign for a ballot to be added to British Guiana's constitution; Collection of early British Guiana stamps
- Spouse: Lucy Amelia (Mamie) Winter
- Parent(s): William Charles Luard and Clara Julia Jane

Edward Chauncey Luard (1856 — 22 September 1900) was a British planter in Demerara, British Guiana (now Guyana). He was influential among the planter community in British Guiana and was a member of the Court of Policy for East Demerara. He led the campaign to introduce a ballot into the colony's constitution in 1895.

A noted philatelist, Luard's collection of the stamps of British Guiana included examples of the "cottonreel" issues, some of which are now part of the Royal Philatelic Collection.

== Early life and family ==
Edward Luard was the eldest son of William Charles Luard (brother of the antiquarian Henry Richards Luard) of Llandaff, South Wales, and Julia Jane Chauncey, and was christened in 1856 at Saint John's Church, Cardiff.

In 1886 he married Lucy Amelia Winter, daughter of Nathaniel Winter, of Blenheim Plantation, Leguan, and had four daughters.

== Career ==
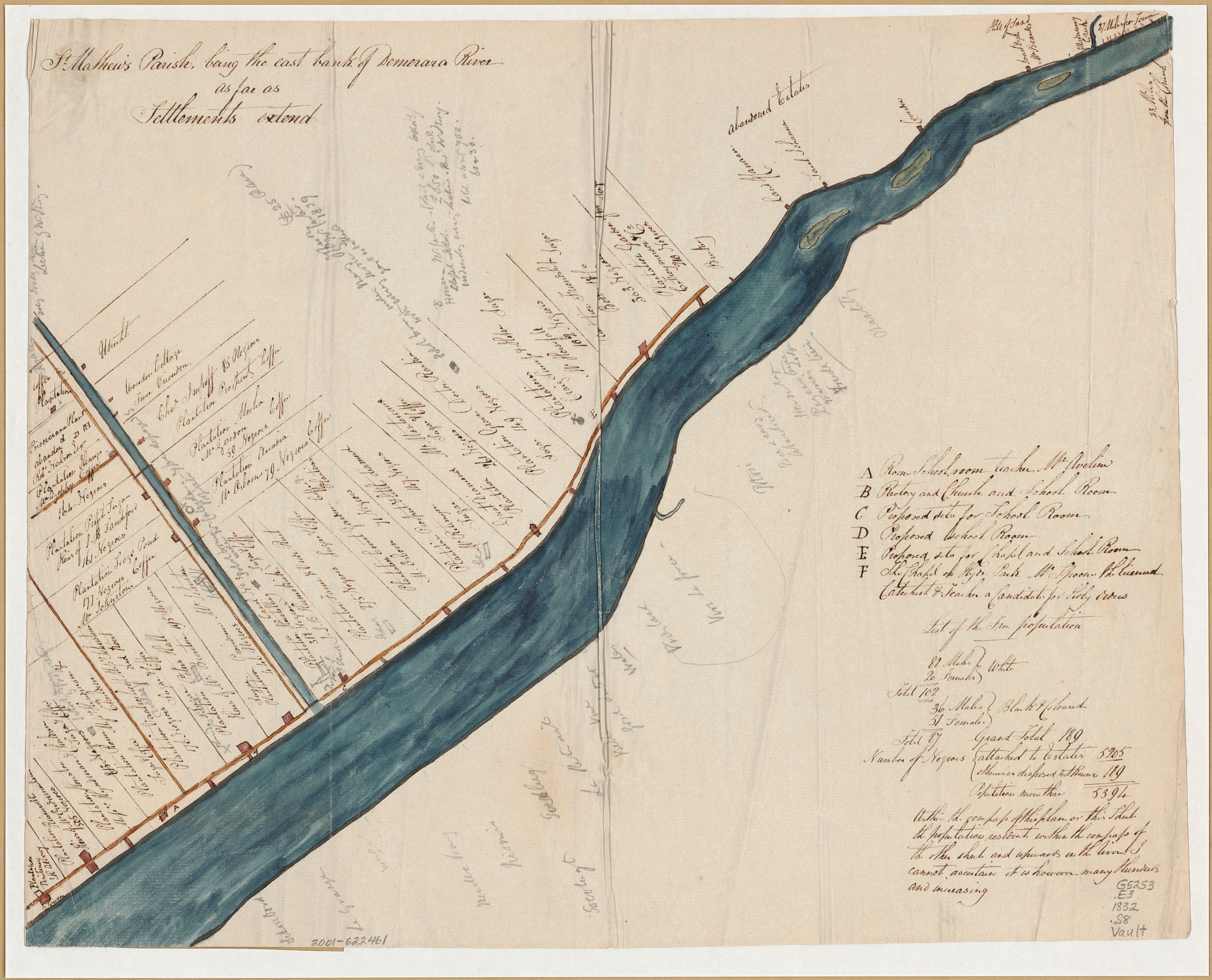
Plantation Peter's Hall (marked B, bottom left) on a map of St. Mathew's Parish, Demerara River east bank, 1832. (map incorrectly orientated)

Luard arrived in British Guiana as a young man, working first at Plantation Peter's Hall, a sugar plantation on the east bank of the Demerara River. In 1882 he was one of the authors of The Overseer's Manual; or, a Guide to the Canefield and the Sugar Factory. Later, he was the owner (or part owner) of La Bonne Intention plantation on the Atlantic coast of Demerara. He was elected a non-resident fellow of the Royal Colonial Institute in 1886.

He became influential among the planter community in British Guiana and was active in the colony's politics as a member of the Court of Policy for East Demerara. With the support of The Argosy, he led the campaign to introduce a ballot into the colony's constitution in 1895.

== Philately ==
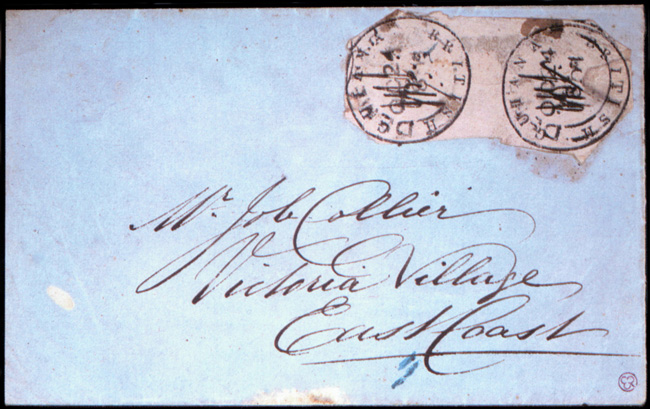
The 1850 British Guiana 2c pink cottonreel stamps on cover, formerly in the Luard collection, now in the Royal Philatelic Collection.

Luard was a philatelist whose collection of British Guiana stamps was sold to Pemberton, Wilson & Co. in 1890 and then to Philipp von Ferrary. It included a pair of the 2c rose "cottonreel" stamps of 1851 on the cover that was later purchased by King George V and is now part of the Royal Philatelic Collection.

In the early 1890s, Luard was in London, resident in Hampstead, and became a member of The Philatelic Society, London (later the Royal Philatelic Society London), attending their meetings and subsequently entering into correspondence with Edward Denny Bacon about the history of the stamps of the colony after he returned to British Guiana.

In 1896, Luard wrote to The London Philatelist from Demerara that he had bought another pair of the 2c pink cottonreels on cover from the Rector of Christ Church, Georgetown, to whom they had been donated by a Miss Rose, an elderly lady parishioner. The cover was addressed to "Miss Rose, Blankenberg". Luard commented that she had since been "besieged" by stamp collectors seeking old stamps of the colony for which there were standing offers to buy in the advertisements of the local newspapers. Unfortunately, she had no more. Luard paid $1,005 (£209) but then sold the cover to Messrs. Stanley Gibbons for £500. The rector offered the impoverished Miss Rose a share of the sale price but she refused to accept anything, saying that she was pleased at last to be "able to give something worth while" to her church.

== Death and legacy ==
Luard died on 22 September 1900 at Strathleven, Dumbarton, in Scotland. He left an estate of £12,171. Probate was granted to his wife Lucy and to Robert Gowan Duncan.

In 2012, he and his relatives and friends were the subject of a collection of letters published in book form and edited by Johanna Merz titled Love in a Distant Land: The Story of Edward Chauncy Luard his Forebears, Friends and Family. A Collection of Letters.

== Selected publications ==
- The Overseer's Manual; or, a Guide to the Canefield and the Sugar Factory. Demerara, 1882. (With F. C. Thorpe et al.) (3rd 1887)

== See also ==
- Neil Ross McKinnon
