= Luard Road =

Street in Wan Chai, Hong Kong

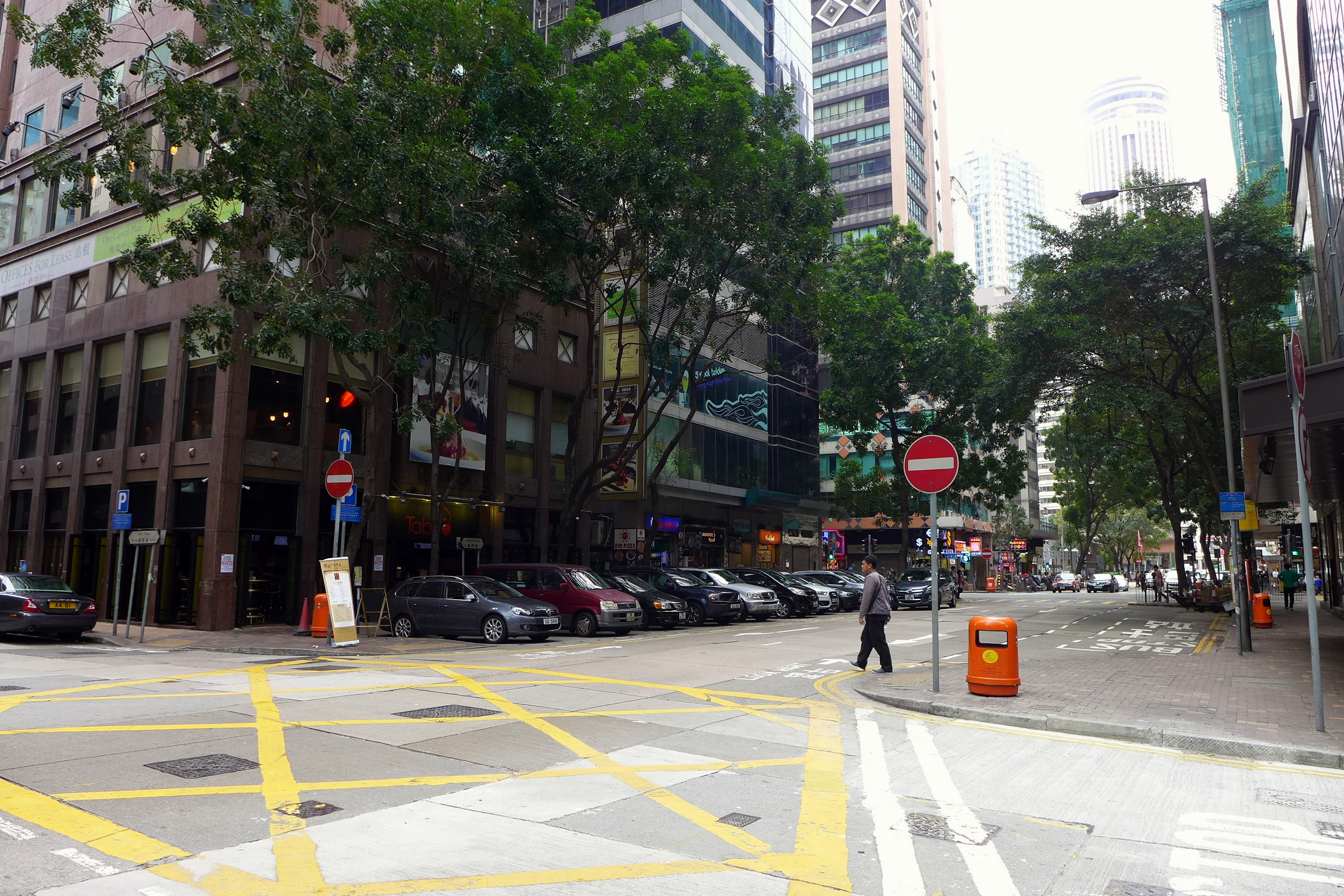
- Luard Road, looking south from the junction with Jaffe Road in 2016
- Interactive map of Luard Road
- Native name: 盧押道 (Yue Chinese)
- Namesake: Charles Camac Luard
- Length: 0.32 km (0.20 mi)
- Location: Hong Kong
- Coordinates: 22.277538°N 114.171618°E

Luard Road
- Traditional Chinese: 盧押道
Transcriptions
Standard Mandarin
- Hanyu Pinyin: Lùyā Dào
Yue: Cantonese
- Jyutping: lou4 ngap3 dou6

Luard Road (Chinese: 盧押道) is a road which runs from south to north in the Wan Chai District of Hong Kong. It begins at the junction with Johnston Road, passing the western side of the Southorn Playground, and ends at the T-junction with Gloucester Road. It is one-way for virtually its entire length; only the short section between Gloucester Road and Jaffe Road carries traffic in both directions.

The street was named after Major-General Charles Camac Luard (1867–1947), who was Commander of British Troops in South China.

== Intersecting streets ==
- Gloucester Road
- Jaffe Road
- Lockhart Road
- Hennessy Road
- Thomson Road
- Johnston Road

== Features ==
- Southorn Playground
