= Sandy Wollaston =

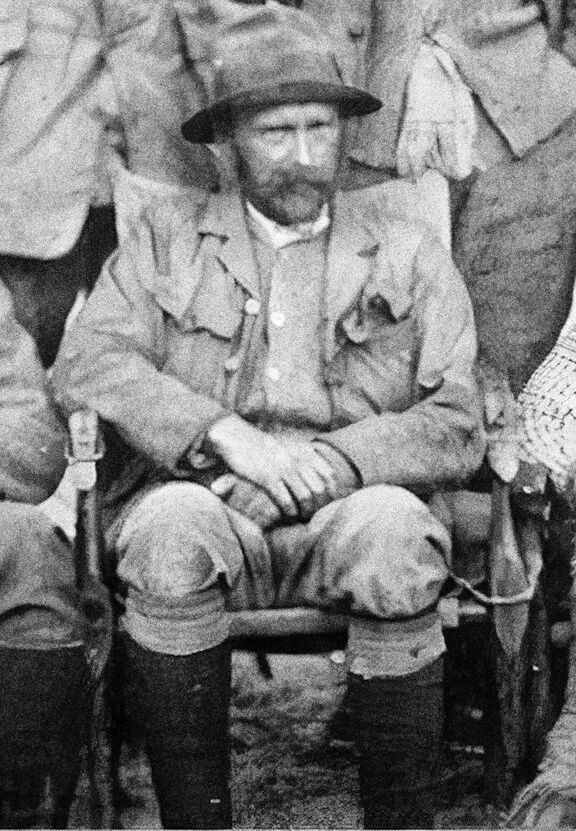
Wollaston on 1921 Mount Everest Expedition

Alexander Frederick Richmond Wollaston (22 May 1875, Clifton, Gloucestershire – 3 June 1930, Cambridge) was an English medical doctor, ornithologist, botanist, climber and explorer. After qualifying as a surgeon in 1903, Wollaston decided to spend his life on exploration and natural history, travelling extensively; he wrote books about his travels and work, and was elected a Fellow of the Royal Geographical Society in 1907. As a tutor at King's College, Cambridge, he was shot dead by a deranged student.

== Early life and education ==
The second son of George Hyde Wollaston (1844-1926), a schoolmaster at Clifton College, formerly a geologist, and his wife Sarah Constance (née Richmond), Sandy Wollaston's paternal grandfather was the amateur scientist Alexander Luard Wollaston, who was himself grandson of the astronomer Francis Wollaston, whose sons included- alongside A. L. Wollaston's father George Hyde Wollaston (1765-1841)- the philosopher Francis John Hyde Wollaston and the chemist William Hyde Wollaston. They descended from the theologian and philosopher William Wollaston. The Wollaston family were landed gentry, of Shenton Hall, Leicestershire, appearing in deeds dating back to the reign of Edward III.

Wollaston was educated at Clifton College before studying medicine at King's College, Cambridge, graduating in 1896 and qualifying as a surgeon in 1903. However, he disliked the medical profession and preferred to spend his life on exploration and natural history. He travelled extensively, visiting Lapland, the Dolomites, Sudan and Japan, as well as participating in the British Museum expedition to the Ruwenzori Mountains of Uganda in 1905-1906.

== Expeditions to New Guinea ==
Wollaston participated in the British Ornithologists' Union Expedition to the Snow Mountains of Netherlands New Guinea in 1910–11. The main aim was to climb the highest mountains there as well as to collect biological and ethnological specimens. However, the expedition was unsuccessful in its primary aim largely because of obfuscation by the Dutch authorities.

In 1912 and 1913 Wollaston led a second expedition (the Wollaston Expedition) to New Guinea. There he succeeded in climbing to within 150 m of the summit of the Carstensz Pyramid, at 4884 m the highest peak on the island, and one not summited until 1962.

He is commemorated in the names of a bat, a skink (lizard) and a frog from New Guinea:

- Wollaston's roundleaf bat, Hipposideros wollastoni
- Wollaston's forest skink, Sphenomorphus wollastoni
- Highland treefrog, Litoria wollastoni

A third expedition to New Guinea was planned but fell through because of the outbreak of the First World War, during which he served as a surgeon in the Royal Navy. He was awarded the Distinguished Service Cross and was mentioned in dispatches for his war work.

Wollaston took part (as doctor, ornithologist and botanist) in the 1921 British Reconnaissance Expedition to Mount Everest. It was in the course of this expedition that he discovered a new Primula, a flower which was subsequently named after him as Wollaston's primrose, Primula wollastonii.

In 1923 Wollaston married Mary "Polly" Meinertzhagen, the sister of Richard Meinertzhagen, with whom he had three children.

He was elected to a Fellowship in the Royal Geographical Society (RGS) in 1907, and received the Gill Memorial in 1914, followed by the society's Patron's Medal in 1925 for his expeditions into Africa and New Guinea. He was appointed honorary secretary of the RGS in 1928.

Wollaston was invited by John Maynard Keynes to be a tutor at King's College, Cambridge. He was killed in 1930 in his rooms at King's by an undergraduate student, Douglas Newton Potts, 19, who fatally shot Wollaston and a police officer Francis Willis with a Webley automatic pistol (that was stolen from fellow student David Gattiker) before shooting himself in a triple murder–suicide. The inquest verdict was murder "during temporary insanity". Wollaston's ashes were deposited in the crypt at King's College Chapel.

== Bibliography ==
Books authored by Wollaston include:

- 1908 – From Ruwenzori to the Congo: a Naturalist's Journey Across Africa. John Murray: London.
- 1912 – Pygmies and Papuans: the Stone Age to-day in Dutch New Guinea. Smith, Elder & Co: London.
- 1921 – Life of Alfred Newton, Professor of Comparative Anatomy Cambridge University, 1866–1907. John Murray: London.
