= Murder of Caroline Mary Luard =

British murder victim

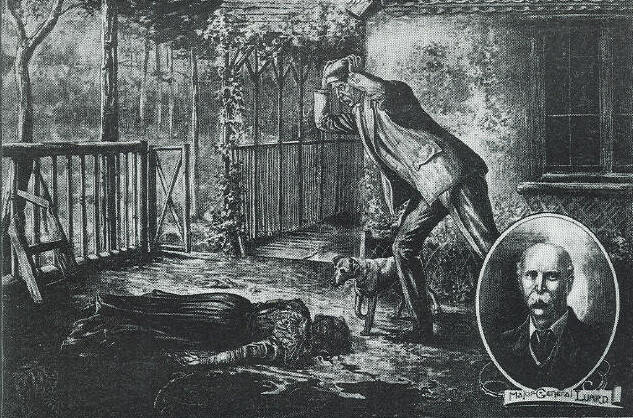
- Location: 51.27422939554082°N 0.25392170869010994°E; Seal Chart
- Date: 24 August 1908
- Attack type: Shooting
- Deaths: 2
- Accused: Charles Luard; John Dickman; Theresa Wilkinson

Caroline Mary Luard (née Hartley; 1850 – 24 August 1908) was the victim of an unsolved murder, known as the Seal Chart Murder, after she was mysteriously shot and killed at an isolated summerhouse in a heavily wooded area between Ightham and Seal Chart, Kent. Her husband, Charles Luard, later committed suicide. It has since been suggested that John Dickman, who was hanged for killing a passenger on a train in 1910, may have been involved in her death.

== Family ==
Born in the last quarter of 1850, Caroline was the youngest daughter of Thomas Hartley JP (1802−1855) and Georgianna Elizabeth Rimington (1814–1878) of Gillfoot, Egremont, Cumberland. On 1 July 1875 she married Charles Edward Luard (1839−1908), son of Robert Luard of Ightham Mote, Kent (brother of John Luard), and his first wife, Mary Elmhirst (brother of Edward Elmhirst. They had two sons:

- Charles Elmhirst Luard DSO (1876−1914), who married Dorothy Frances Barrett (1885−1978) and had one son, Charles William Hartley Luard (1914−1928); he was killed in action at Missy-sur-Aisne in 1914
- Edward Dalbiac Luard (1878−1903), who died on active service in Somaliland

== The murder ==
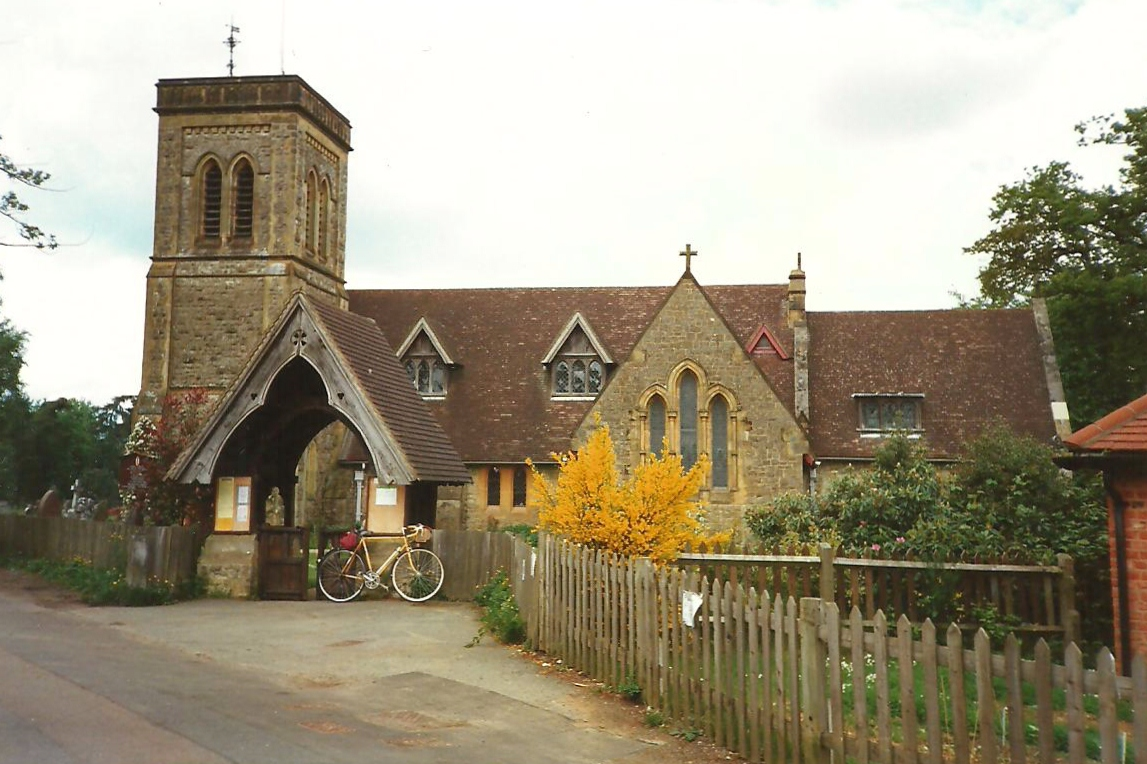
St. Lawrence Church

Location of nearby church

On 24 August 1908, at about 2.30 pm, Luard and her husband left their home and went for a walk with their dog. According to her husband's account, they had two very different purposes. He wished to retrieve his golf clubs from the clubhouse at Godden Green Golf Club prior to a holiday that he and his wife were intending to take, while she merely wanted to get some exercise before returning home where she was expecting a Mrs Stewart, wife of a local solicitor, for afternoon tea.

Accordingly, having walked about a mile from their home, along the road that passed close to St Lawrence's Church and the associated school, at 3.00 pm they parted ways at a wicket gate. This gate led on to a path that led to a ‘bungalow summer house’ known as ‘La Casa’, owned by the Luards’ neighbours, the Wilkinsons of Frankfield House, and which both families were accustomed to using from time to time. Beyond the summer house was a path through the woods which would allow Caroline to return home in good time for her visitor.

Charles Luard, meanwhile, set off in the direction of the golf course and was seen at various times during the next hour. At 3.20 pm, he was seen by Thomas Durrand at Hall Farm. Between 3.25 and 3.30 pm, he was observed by a labourer some 400 yards from the golf links and again, by the same man, between 3.35 and 3.40 pm. At 3.35 pm, he was seen by the Golf Club Steward, on the links.

Having collected his clubs, at 4.05 pm he met the local vicar, Rev. A. B. Cotton, who was in his motor car and apparently driving in the opposite direction. Cotton nevertheless took Luard's golf clubs, presumably to save him the trouble of carrying them any further and in the expectation of returning shortly in the right direction. This occurred at 4.20 pm, when Rev. Cotton stopped to pick up Luard, depositing him and his golf clubs at Ightham Knoll at around 4.25 pm.

At home, Charles Luard found Mrs. Stewart awaiting the return of Caroline. Consequently, he set off in search of his wife by the woodland route, at approximately 4.30 pm. He eventually found her, at about 5.15 pm, on the verandah of the summer house which was otherwise locked and empty. She had been shot in the head, and her three rings and purse were missing. No cartridges were found at the scene, merely some “disappearing footprints”.

The time of the murder was estimated to be 3.15 pm when her husband was walking towards the golf clubhouse. Three shots were heard at about that time by two witnesses – Annie Wickham, a long-standing local resident and wife of a coachman, and Daniel Kettel, a gardener. Wickham claimed the shots came from the direction of the summer house. She was at the Wilkinsons' home at Frankfield House at the time – about 500 yards from the summer house. Both claimed not to have investigated the gunshots, due to their belief they came from a hunting party.

== Aftermath ==
Scotland Yard was immediately involved in the investigation and two bloodhounds, named Sceptre and Solferino, owned by a Major Richardson of Stratford-upon-Avon, were brought in to sniff out the route by which the killer had made his escape. However, the trail apparently went cold at the main road.

The initial inquest hearing into the death was held at Ightham Knoll, the Luards' home, on 26 August 1908. Dr Mansfield, who had carried out the post-mortem examination of the body, reported that Caroline had initially been hit on the back of the head and that the blow had been of sufficient force to knock her to the ground, where she had vomited. Her killer had then shot her behind her right ear, with a second shot being fired into her left cheek.

Prior to the inquest, her husband had been encouraged to write an account of the events of the afternoon of 24 August, about which he was questioned at some length. In describing his discovery of his wife's body he stated that, ‘I then examined her dress and found that it was torn. Her pocket at the back of the skirt had been torn open. One of her gloves, which was lying near, was inside out, as though it had been torn off. She had both gloves on when she left me. I then looked at her hands, and saw that her rings were missing. She wore all her rings on the left hand, and always wore them, except when she washed her hands. One of the rings was over a hundred years old. It was an heirloom given to her by her mother. It was of an old design of mounting.’

Charles Luard admitted that he owned three revolvers. However, he claimed to be unable to remember where he kept his ammunition. The gun expert Edwin Churchill stated that, after examining the two bullets, he had concluded that they had come from a .320 revolver, which had been fired when the gun was no more than a few inches away from the victim's head. He also said that none of her husband's own revolvers would have been capable of firing such bullets, since his guns were all of much smaller calibre.

The police hoped that the pocket that had been ripped off the dress would lead them to her murderer; however, it was found at Ightham Knoll, on the day before the funeral, by a maid who was shaking out the sheet in which the body had been carried back to the house from 'La Casa'. It was also hoped that the rings would be sold or pawned and so provide a trail to the murderer, but they were never seen again.

The inquest resumed a fortnight later at the George & Dragon Inn, Ightham. Charles Luard was again questioned and was asked by the coroner if he was aware of 'any incident in the life of the deceased or yourself which in your opinion would cause any person to entertain any feelings of revenge or jealousy towards either of you?' He replied 'No' and said that neither of them had received any letters suggesting that there had been such an incident. He also denied the allegation that his wife had received a letter prior to her death from someone seeking to make an appointment with her.

=== Charles Luard ===
Since the murder, a whispering campaign had been underway that suggested that her husband was the murderer and that the theft of her rings was merely a device to throw the police off his track. Now he began to receive anonymous letters accusing him of the shooting. The volume of these letters and their vitriolic contents apparently persuaded him that he should leave the district; he advertised the remainder of the lease on Ightham Knoll for sale and made arrangements to have the house's contents put up for auction. In the meantime, he was aware that his son Charles, having learnt of his mother's death, was returning from South Africa to be with him and would be arriving in Southampton on 18 September.

Luards friend, Colonel Warde MP (photographed in 1895).

Charles Luard was invited to stay with Colonel Charles Edward Warde, the local Member of Parliament and brother of the Chief Constable of Kent, Henry Warde. Colonel Warde collected him at the end of the inquest proceedings on 17 September and drove him to his home, Barham Court, near Wateringbury. In the morning, Luard bathed and breakfasted, and then spent some time writing letters to his son and to Colonel Warde. He then walked to the railway line at Teston, hid in some bushes, and jumped in front of the 9.09 train from Maidstone West to Tonbridge. He had pinned a note to his coat saying, 'Whoever finds me take me to Colonel Warde'.

On hearing of Luard's death, Colonel Warde went to Southampton and broke the news to Luard's son in the cabin of the steamer on which he had just arrived.

The eventual verdict of the inquest into the death of Caroline Luard was 'murder by person or persons unknown'. Later on, it was determined that her husband had committed 'suicide while temporarily insane'.

A month later it was reported that an Inspector Jarvis of Scotland Yard had been in Winnipeg for three weeks and expected to apprehend the murderer at any moment. Jarvis was said to be in Canada, on no salary, purely in the expectation that he would receive the £1,000 reward that was on offer for the killer's arrest. However, no arrest was ever made.

The idea that the murderer was a gypsy, hop-picker or itinerant with a revolver in his pocket, who was prepared to perpetrate a random killing for the sake of a few rings (of which he would have been unaware until he tore the glove from the victim's dead hand) was generally dismissed. The police seem to have believed that the killer was known to Caroline, that the crime was planned, and that the theft of the rings was an attempt to mislead them about the motive for the murder.

=== John Dickman ===
There has been speculation that the killer was John Dickman who, in 1910, was sentenced to death for the murder of a man named Nisbet on a train in Morpeth (324 miles North of ightham). Dickman's conviction was considered unsafe by a number of people, including five of the jury that found him guilty and who later signed a petition calling for him to be reprieved. Sir Sidney Orme Rowan-Hamilton, who was Chief Justice of Bermuda in the 1930s and who wrote a book about the Dickman case in 1914, seems to have been convinced that Dickman murdered Caroline Luard. He believed that she had responded to an advertisement that Dickman had placed in The Times, asking for financial help, by sending him a cheque. Dickman had subsequently forged this cheque - presumably by changing the amount - and when Caroline discovered this, she contacted him and arranged to meet him without her husband's knowledge.

It has also been claimed that the judge who tried Dickman, the three Appeal Court judges who heard and rejected his appeal, and the Home Secretary, Winston Churchill, who refused to commute Dickman's death sentence, were all friends of Charles Luard and bent on avenging his and his wife's deaths.

=== Theresa Wilkinson ===
In 2014, it was suggested Theresa Wilkinson, daughter of the owners of 'La Casa', who was present at the time, may have committed the murder.

== In popular culture ==
External videos
- In Suspicious Circumstances October 1996 series 5, episode 12

British author Minette Walters fictionalized the story of the murder in the novella A Dreadful Murder (2013).

Osbert Sitwell also fictionalized the case in the short story The Greeting.

In October 1996, In Suspicious Circumstances reenacted the case in series 5, episode 12 on itv.

== See also ==
- List of unsolved murders in the United Kingdom

== Notes ==
1.Caroline Luard and Charles Luard
