= Richard Luard =

British Army general

Lieutenant-General Richard Luard CB
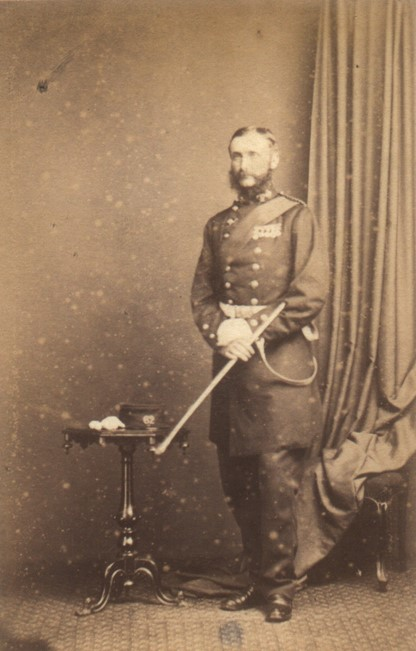
- Luard in c. 1865
- Born: 29 July 1827; British India
- Died: 24 July 1891 (aged 63) Eastbourne, England
- Allegiance: Canada
- Branch: Canadian Militia
- Rank: Lieutenant-General
- Commands: General Officer Commanding the Militia of Canada
- Conflicts: Crimean War; Second Opium War
- Awards: Companion of the Order of the Bath

Lieutenant-General Richard George Amherst Luard CB (29 July 1827 – 24 July 1891) was a British Army officer who became General Officer Commanding the Militia of Canada.

== Military career ==
Born the eldest son of Lieutenant-Colonel John Luard in India and educated at the Royal Military Academy Sandhurst, Luard was commissioned into the 51st Regiment of Foot in 1845. Later that year he transferred to the 3rd Regiment of Foot. In 1854 he transferred to the 77th Regiment of Foot and served in the Crimean War as a Deputy Assistant Adjutant-General: he was mentioned in despatches for his part in the Siege of Sevastopol. He served in the Second Opium War taking part in an expedition to China in 1857. In 1860 he was appointed Assistant Inspector of Volunteers and in 1875 he was made assistant adjutant and quartermaster-general for the Northern District in England.

In 1880 he became General Officer Commanding the Militia of Canada. He sought to introduce permanent infantry training schools but also upset Adolphe-Philippe Caron, the Minister of Militia and Defence, through his constant criticism of amateur soldiers. He was asked to resign and, in 1884, returned to England to command a brigade at Aldershot Garrison.

== Family ==
Luard was married on 8 October 1863 to Hannah Chamberlain. They had seven children including Edward Bourryau Luard (1870–1916), who achieved the rank of lieutenant colonel in the King's Shropshire Light Infantry and was killed near Ypres in the First World War. Another son was Charles Camac Luard.

He was a cousin of the antiquarian Henry Richards Luard and the organist Bertram Luard-Selby, and his grandchildren included the singer Sir Peter Neville Luard Pears.

Military offices
Preceded by Edward Selby Smyth	General Officer Commanding the Militia of Canada; 1880–1884	Succeeded by Sir Frederick Middleton
