= William Luard =

Royal Navy Admiral (1820–1910)

Admiral Sir William Luard KCB
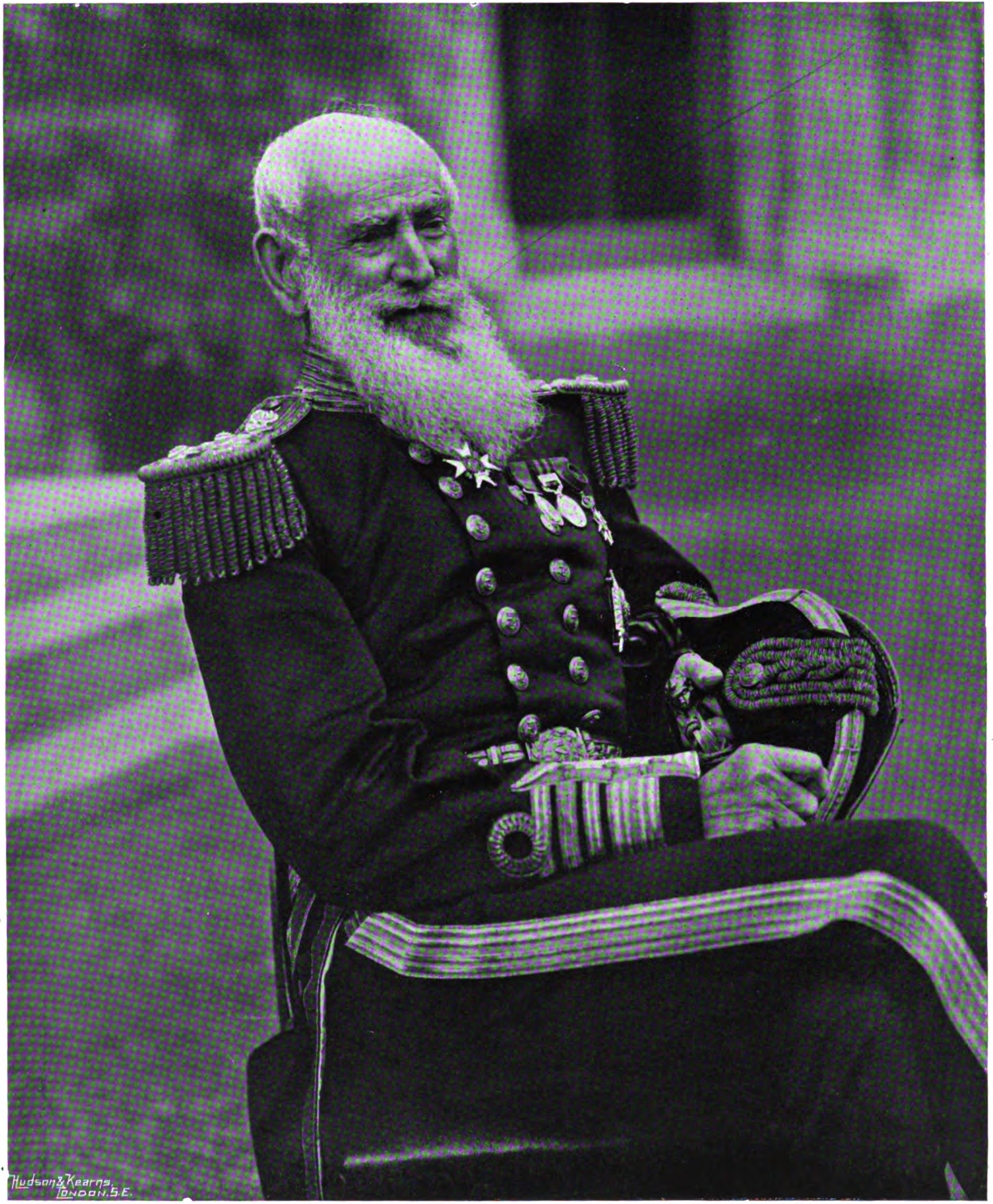
- Born: 7 April 1820
- Died: 19 May 1910 (aged 90)
- Military career
- Allegiance: United Kingdom
- Branch: Royal Navy
- Rank: Admiral
- Commands: Royal Naval College, Greenwich
- Awards: Knight Commander of the Order of the Bath

Admiral Sir William Garnham Luard, KCB (7 April 1820 – 19 May 1910) was a British Royal Navy officer.

== Naval career ==
Born in 1820, he was the eldest son of a local magistrate, William Wright Luard J.P., D.L. of Witham Lodge, Witham, Essex (formerly of Hatfield Peverel Priory) and Charlotte Garnham, only child of Thomas Garnham of Belchamp Hall (Felsham Hall in Lovejoy) in Suffolk. The Luards were a prominent family of Protestant Huguenot merchants who had fled to England from Caen, Normandy in the late 17th century as part of the mass exodus of Huguenots from France to England that followed the 1685 revocation of the Edict of Nantes.

Luard entered the Royal Naval College (formerly the Royal Naval Academy) at Portsmouth at the age of 13 and later studied at Portsmouth Naval College. He served extensively and saw action in the South China Sea, for which he was recognized in dispatches and decorated for gallantry and bravery several times including being named Companion of the Order of the Bath (CB).

After a distinguished career as a naval officer, including as captain and commander of HMS Formidable and HMS Conqueror, he served as superintendent of the Sheerness Dockyard and the Malta Dockyard. From 1882 to 1885, he was President of the Royal Naval College, Greenwich.

He was awarded the Burmese War Medal for dispersing the pirates of Chui-a-poo and received the Legion of Honour, 4th Class, from Emperor Napoleon III. He was promoted rear-admiral in 1875, vice-admiral on 15 June 1879, and admiral in 1885. The Luard Islands, an archipelago off the coast of Port Moresby, Papua New Guinea were named after him.

Luard was advanced to KCB by Queen Victoria in 1897, during her diamond jubilee year.

Luard married Charlotte Du Cane (an anglicization of the original French surname 'Du Quesne') in 1858, with whom he had 13 children. She was from another French Huguenot family (see Jean Du Quesne, the elder and descendants), with landed estates at Braxted Park and Coggeshall.

A staunch Liberal and supporter of Prime Minister William Gladstone, Luard retired to his estate in Essex where he served as a justice of the peace and as an active member of the court of Quarter Sessions. He died in 1910 as a result of injuries sustained in a carriage accident. His funeral cortege in his home town of Witham, Essex attracted thousands of mourners.

== See also ==
- O'Byrne, William Richard (1849). "Luard, William Garnham" . A Naval Biographical Dictionary . John Murray – via Wikisource.

Military offices
Preceded by Edward Rice	Admiral Superintendent, Malta Dockyard; 1878–1879	Succeeded by John McCrea
Preceded by Sir Geoffrey Hornby	President, Royal Naval College, Greenwich; 1882–1885	Succeeded by Sir Thomas Brandreth
