= Lowes Dalbiac Luard =

British painter

- Born: 1872; Calcutta
- Died: 1944 (aged 71–72); London
- Education: Slade School of Fine Art
- Known for: Portrait painting

Lowes Dalbiac Luard (27 August 1872 – 1944) was a British painter.

== Early life ==
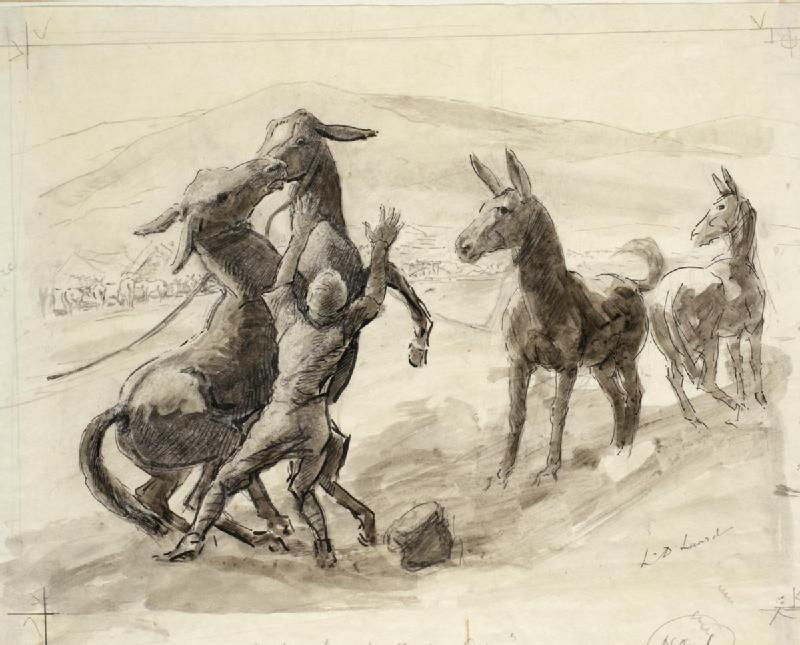
A Mountain Battery – in the mule-lines (Art.IWM ART LD 4229)

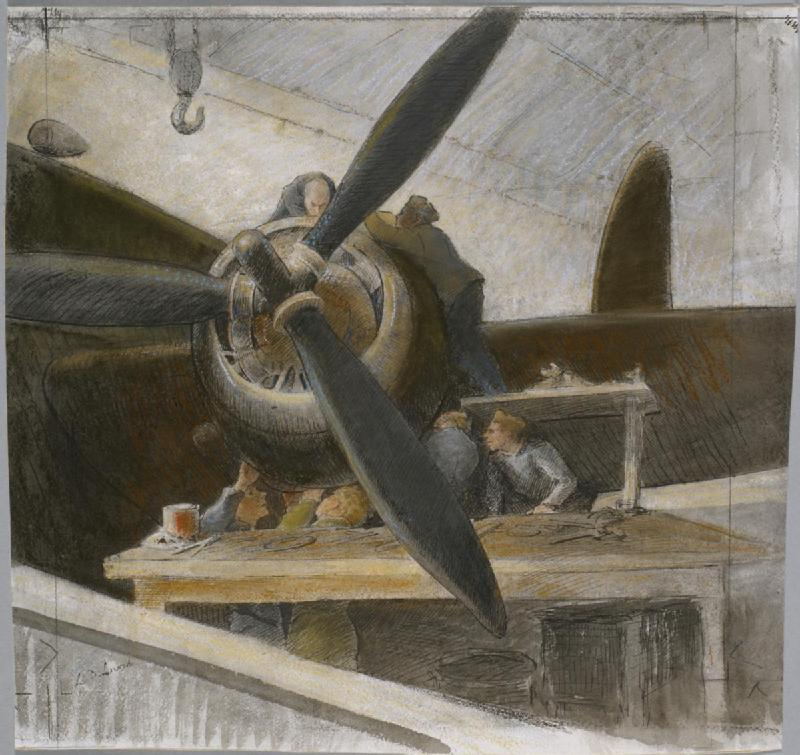
Pressing Repairs (Art.IWM ART LD 4227)

Luard was born in Calcutta, the son of Col. Charles Henry Luard of the Royal Engineers and grandson of Lt.-Col. John Luard. Educated in England, and having won a place at the University of Oxford to study mathematics at Balliol, he decided instead to study art, and in 1892 enrolled at the Slade School of Fine Art in London, where his contemporaries included Augustus John and Ambrose McEvoy. He left the Slade in 1897 and then studied in Paris under Lucien Simon and Rene Menard.

In 1901 he married Louisa Margaret Blackwell, and their daughter Veronica Mary (who later married Sir Maurice Lyell, a High Court Judge) was born the following year. In 1905 the family settled in Paris in 1905 where, except for the war years, Luard continued to live for almost 30 years. In Paris he became well known for his paintings and drawings of large working horses. Two of his most notable paintings, Timberhauling on the Seine (1914) and Percherons at Water (1911), are from this period.

== World War I ==
Lowes Luard enlisted in the British Army Service Corps in 1914, and served throughout the First World War, being awarded both the DSO, the Croix de Guerre and was mentioned in despatches five times. Even whilst serving in the army Luard continued to draw, usually charcoal studies of horses pulling heavy guns or other loads through mud. In 1922, the Société des Artistes Rouennais, in Rouen, exhibited eight paintings and pastels by Luard.

== Later life ==
After the war Luard's interests broadened to include landscapes and seascapes. He moved to London in 1934 and became a regular visitor to the racecourse and stables at Newmarket, where he would often paint scenes of thoroughbred racehorses training on the gallops. In 1936 Faber and Faber published his book The Horse: Its Action and Anatomy, the first study of the skeleton, muscles and physiognomy of the horse since George Stubbs' treatise, The Anatomy of the Horse. During World War II, Lowes Luard was contracted to provide a number of works for the War Artists' Advisory Committee. He died in London in 1944.
