= Henry Luard =

British historian (1825–1891)

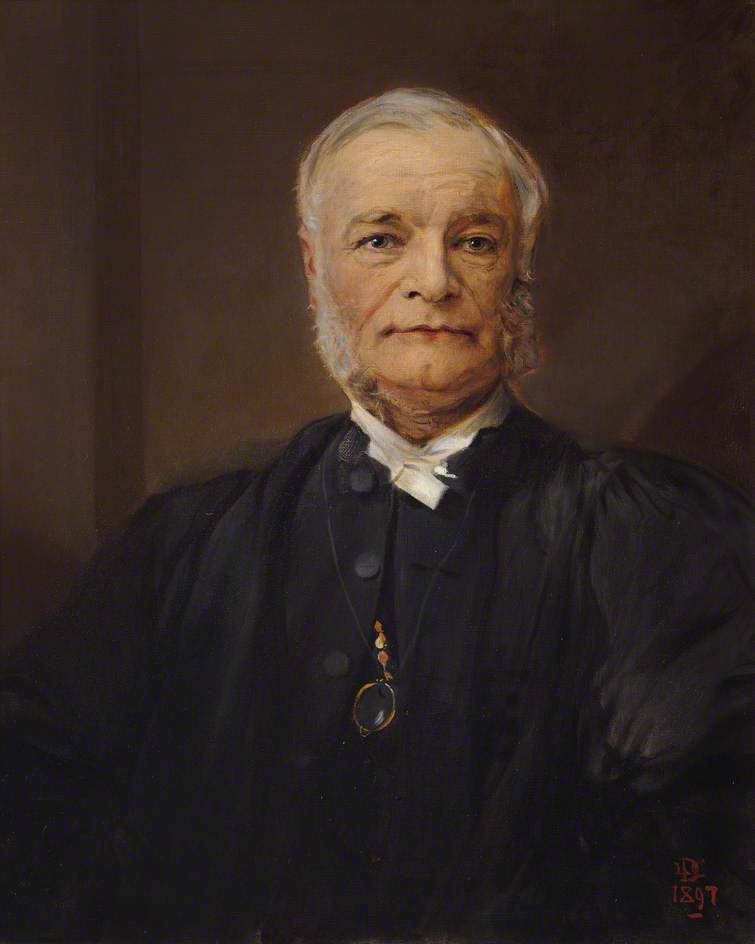
Portrait of Henry Luard by Lowes Cato Dickinson at the Trinity College, Cambridge (1897)

Henry Richards Luard (25 August 1825 – 1 May 1891) was a British medieval historian and antiquary.

== Biography ==
Luard was born on 25 August 1825 in London, the son of Henry Luard. His uncle was Lt.-Col. John Luard, and his cousins included Lt.-Gen. Richard George Amherst Luard and the organist Bertram Luard-Selby. He received his early education at Cheam School, Surrey. He graduated from Trinity College, Cambridge in 1847; and in 1849 was elected to a Fellowship. He entered holy orders, and served as vicar of the Church of St Mary the Great, Cambridge from 1860 to 1887. Luard Road in Cambridge is named after him.

== Antiquarian activities ==
Luard was a Fellow of Trinity College, Cambridge, and of King's College London; and was Registrary of the University of Cambridge, where he worked on cataloguing the manuscripts in the Cambridge University Library. He edited 17 volumes of medieval chronicles and other texts for the Rolls Series, and was an early scholarly editor of the papers of Isaac Newton.

== Personal life ==
In 1862 Luard married Louisa Calthorpe, youngest daughter of George Hodson, Archdeacon of Stafford. She pre-deceased him in 1889. Luard died on 1 May 1891 in Cambridge. Both Luard and his wife are buried at Parish of the Ascension Burial Ground, Cambridge.
