= John Luard =

British Army officer (1790–1875)

Lieutenant-Colonel John Luard (1790–1875) was a British Army officer and author of History of the Dress of the British Soldier

== Life ==
He was fourth son of Captain Peter John Luard of the 4th Dragoons, of Blyborough, Kirton-in-Lindsey, Lincolnshire, and his wife Louisa, daughter of Charles Dalbiac of Hungerford Park, Berkshire, born on 5 May 1790. His seven brothers included Henry Luard, a banker (father of the antiquarian Henry Richards Luard) and Robert (father of the organist Bertram Luard-Selby). He served in the Royal Navy 1802–1807, and on 25 May 1809 obtained a cornetcy without purchase in his father's old regiment.

Luard served in the 4th Dragoons through the Peninsular War campaigns of 1810–1814, gaining a Military General Service Medal with clasps for the battles of Albuera, Salamanca, and Toulouse. Afterwards he served with the 16th Light Dragoons as lieutenant at the battle of Waterloo (medal), and as captain at Bhurtpoor in 1825–1826 (Army of India Medal).

Exchanging to the 30th Foot in 1832, Luard retired as major in 1834, and obtained a brevet lieutenant-colonelcy in 1838. He took up sculpture, and chaired the Farnham School of Art. He died on 24 October 1875, at The Cedars, Farnham, Surrey, his home.

== Works ==
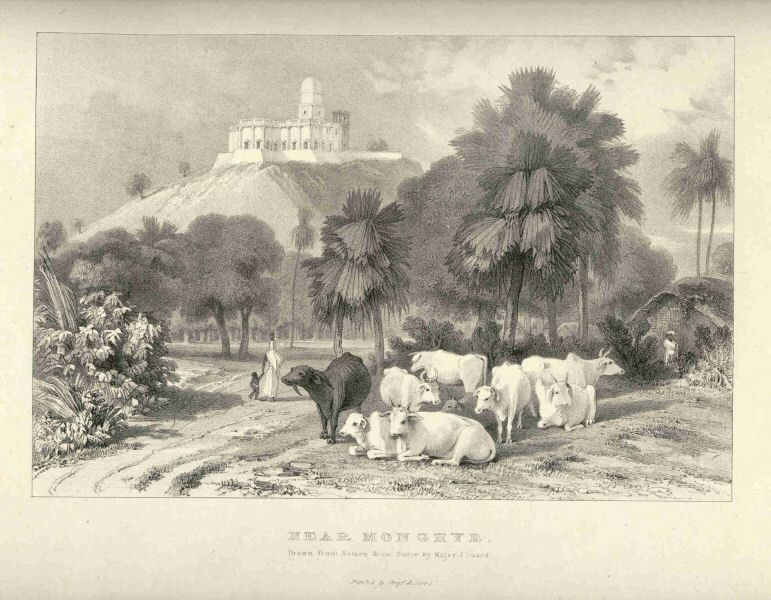
Near Monghyr (i.e. Munger), 1840s lithograph by John Luard

Like others of his family, Luard was an artist. He published Views in India, St. Helena, and Car Nicobar (London, 1835), drawn from nature and on stone by himself, and History of the Dress of the British Soldier, published by subscription in 1852.

Some of Luard's sketches were used to illustrate Wanderings of a Pilgrim in Search of the Picturesque (1850) by Fanny Parkes (Fanny Parlby), who had commissioned him as a watercolour artist. In 1851 at the Asiatic Gallery, Baker Street Bazaar, Portman Square, London, the "Grand Moving Diorama of Hindostan" comprised 60 drawings arranged by Luard. The artists creating the diorama included Louis Haghe, who did the "figures and animals", and William Adolphus Knell the "shipping"; the panoramic setting was by Philip Phillips. Luard based the material on his own sketches, and on those of Parkes, and eight others were credited.

His sketches formed the basis of the design the Ghuznee Medal, awarded for storming the fortress of Ghuznee during the First Anglo-Afghan War, although he did not serve in the war himself.

== Family ==
Luard married Elizabeth, second daughter of Colonel Richard Scott, H.E.I.C.S., with whom he had a family. Their children included:

- Richard George Amherst Luard (1827–1891), eldest son
- John Dalbiac Luard (1830–1860), second son
- Frederic Peter Luard (born 1835)
- Charles Henry Luard (born 1837), Bengal Engineers and Royal Engineers, (father of Lowes Dalbiac Luard)
- Elisabeth Louisa Luard
- Susan Anne Maria Luard

== Notes ==
Attribution

This article incorporates text from a publication now in the public domain: Lee, Sidney, ed. (1893). "Luard, John". Dictionary of National Biography. Vol. 34. London: Smith, Elder & Co.
