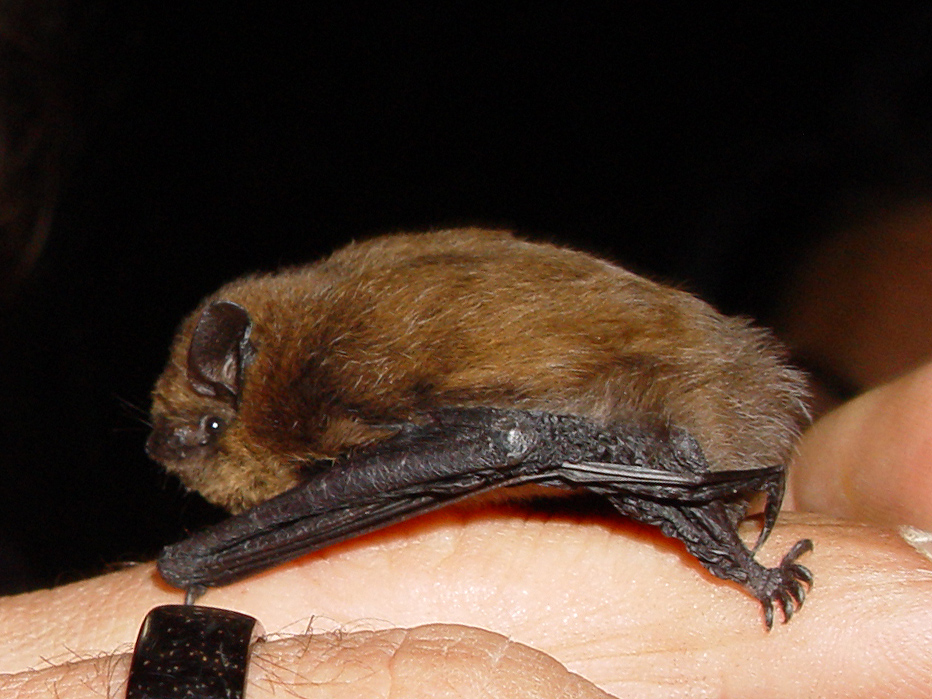
- Common pipistrelle (Pipistrellus pipistrellus)

Scientific classification
- Kingdom: Animalia
- Phylum: Chordata
- Class: Mammalia
- Order: Chiroptera
- Family: Vespertilionidae
- Subfamily: Vespertilioninae; Gray, 1821

Tribes
- Antrozoini; Eptesicini; Lasiurini; Nycticeiini; Perimyotini; Pipistrellini; Plecotini; Scotophilini; Vespertilionini; ?Rhyneptesicus

= Vespertilioninae =

Subfamily of bats

The Vespertilioninae are a subfamily of vesper bats from the family Vespertilionidae.

== Classification ==
Subfamily Vespertilioninae

- Tribe Antrozoini
  - Genus Antrozous
    - Pallid bat, Antrozous pallidus
  - Genus Bauerus
    - Van Gelder's bat, Bauerus dubiaquercus
  - Genus Rhogeessa - Rhogeessa bats
    - Yucatan yellow bat, Rhogeessa aenea
    - Allen's yellow bat, Rhogeessa alleni
    - Bickham's yellow bat, Rhogeessa bickhami
    - Genoways's yellow bat, Rhogeessa genowaysi
    - Slender yellow bat, Rhogeessa gracilis
    - Husson's yellow bat, Rhogeessa hussoni
    - Thomas's yellow bat, Rhogeessa io
    - Menchu's yellow bat, Rhogeessa menchuae
    - Tiny yellow bat, Rhogeessa minutilla
    - Least yellow bat, Rhogeessa mira
    - Northern little yellow bat, Rhogeessa parvula
    - Nicaraguan little yellow bat, Rhogeessa permutandis
    - Black-winged little yellow bat, Rhogeessa tumida
    - Ecuadorian little yellow bat, Rhogeessa velilla
- Tribe Eptesicini
  - Genus Arielulus
    - Bronze sprite, Arielulus circumdatus
    - Coppery sprite, Arielulus cuprosus
    - Social sprite, Arielulus societatis
  - Genus Eptesicus – house bats
    - Anatolian serotine, Eptesicus anatolicus
    - Little black serotine, Eptesicus andinus
    - Bobrinski's serotine, Eptesicus bobrinskoi
    - Botta's serotine, Eptesicus bottae
    - Brazilian brown bat, Eptesicus brasiliensis
    - Chiriquinan serotine, Eptesicus chiriquinus
    - Diminutive serotine, Eptesicus diminutus
    - Horn-skinned bat, Eptesicus floweri
    - Argentine brown bat, Eptesicus furinalis
    - Big brown bat, Eptesicus fuscus
    - Gobi big brown bat, Eptesicus gobiensis
    - Guadeloupe big brown bat, Eptesicus guadeloupensis
    - Long-tailed house bat, Eptesicus hottentotus
    - Harmless serotine, Eptesicus innoxius
    - Meridional serotine, Eptesicus isabellinus
    - Japanese short-tailed bat, Eptesicus japonensis
    - Kobayashi's bat, Eptesicus kobayashii
    - Langer's serotine, Eptesicus langeri
    - Eptesicus lobatus
    - Northern bat, Eptesicus nilssonii
    - Ognev's serotine, Eptesicus ognevi
    - Orinoco serotine, Eptesicus orinocensis
    - Oriental serotine, Eptesicus pachyomus
    - Thick-eared bat, Eptesicus pachyotis
    - Lagos serotine, Eptesicus platyops
    - Serotine bat, Eptesicus serotinus
    - Taddei's serotine, Eptesicus taddeii
    - Sombre bat, Eptesicus tatei
    - Ulapes serotine, Eptesicus ulapesensis
  - Genus Glauconycteris – butterfly bats
    - Allen's striped bat, Glauconycteris alboguttata
    - Silvered bat, Glauconycteris argentata
    - Blackish butterfly bat, Glauconycteris atra
    - Beatrix's bat, Glauconycteris beatrix
    - Curry's bat, Glauconycteris curryae
    - Bibundi bat, Glauconycteris egeria
    - Glen's wattled bat, Glauconycteris gleni
    - Allen's spotted bat, Glauconycteris humeralis
    - Kenyan wattled bat, Glauconycteris kenyacola
    - Machado's butterfly bat, Glauconycteris machadoi
    - Abo bat, Glauconycteris poensis
    - Pied butterfly bat, Glauconycteris superba
    - Variegated butterfly bat, Glauconycteris variegata
  - Genus Hesperoptenus – false serotine bats
    - Blanford's bat, Hesperoptenus blanfordi
    - False serotine bat, Hesperoptenus doriae
    - Gaskell's false serotine, Hesperoptenus gaskelli
    - Tickell's bat, Hesperoptenus tickelli
    - Large false serotine, Hesperoptenus tomesi
  - Genus Histiotus – big-eared brown bats
    - Strange big-eared brown bat, Histiotus alienus
    - Cadena-García's big-eared brown bat, Histiotus cadenai
    - Colombian big-eared brown bat, Histiotus colombiae
    - Transparent-winged big-eared brown bat, Histiotus diaphanopterus
    - Humboldt big-eared brown bat, Histiotus humboldti
    - Thomas's big-eared brown bat, Histiotus laephotis
    - Big-eared brown bat, Histiotus macrotus
    - Southern big-eared brown bat, Histiotus magellanicus
    - Moche big-eared brown bat, Histiotus mochica
    - Small big-eared brown bat, Histiotus montanus
    - Tropical big-eared brown bat, Histiotus velatus
  - Genus Ia
    - Great evening bat, Ia io
  - Genus Lasionycteris
    - Silver-haired bat, Lasionycteris noctivagans
  - Genus Scoteanax
    - Rüppell's broad-nosed bat, Scoteanax rueppellii
  - Genus Scotomanes
    - Harlequin bat, Scotomanes ornatus
  - Genus Scotorepens - lesser broad-nosed bats
    - Inland broad-nosed bat, Scotorepens balstoni
    - Little broad-nosed bat, Scotorepens greyii
    - Eastern broad-nosed bat, Scotorepens orion
    - Northern broad-nosed bat, Scotorepens sanborni
  - Genus Thainycteris
    - Collared sprite, Thainycteris aureocollaris
    - Necklace sprite, Thainycteris torquatus
- Tribe incertae sedis
  - Genus Rhyneptesicus
    - Sind bat, Rhyneptesicus nasutus
- Tribe Lasiurini
  - Genus Aeorestes – hoary bats
    - Hoary bat, Aeorestes cinereus
    - Big red bat, Aeorestes egregius
    - Hawaiian hoary bat, Aeorestes semotus
    - South American hoary bat, Aeorestes villosissimus
  - Genus Dasypterus – yellow bats
    - Southern yellow bat, Dasypterus ega
    - Cuban yellow bat, Dasypterus insularis
    - Northern yellow bat, Dasypterus intermedius
    - Western yellow bat, Dasypterus xanthinus
  - Genus Lasiurus – red or hairy-tailed bats
    - Arequipa red bat, Lasiurus arequipae
    - Greater red bat, Lasiurus atratus
    - Southern red bat, Lasiurus blossevillii
    - Eastern red bat, Lasiurus borealis
    - Tacarcuna bat, Lasiurus castaneus
    - Jamaican red bat, Lasiurus degelidus
    - Hairy-tailed bat, Lasiurus ebenus
    - Western red bat, Lasiurus frantzii
    - Minor red bat, Lasiurus minor
    - Pfeiffer's red bat, Lasiurus pfeifferi
    - Seminole bat, Lasiurus seminolus
    - Cinnamon red bat, Lasiurus varius
- Tribe Nycticeiini
  - Genus Nycticeius – evening bats
    - Temminck's mysterious bat, Nycticeius aenobarbus
    - Evening bat, Nycticeius humeralis
    - Cuban evening bat, Nycticeius cubanus
- Tribe Perimyotini
  - Genus Parastrellus
    - Canyon bat, Parastrellus hesperus
  - Genus Perimyotis
    - Tricolored bat, Perimyotis subflavus
- Tribe Pipistrellini
  - Genus Glischropus – thick-thumbed bats
    - Dark thick-thumbed bat, Glischropus aquilus
    - Indochinese thick-thumbed bat, Glischropus bucephalus
    - Javan thick-thumbed bat, Glischropus javanus
    - Common thick-thumbed bat, Glischropus tylopus
  - Genus Nyctalus – noctule bats
    - Birdlike noctule, Nyctalus aviator
    - Azores noctule, Nyctalus azoreum
    - Japanese noctule, Nyctalus furvus
    - Greater noctule bat, Nyctalus lasiopterus
    - Lesser noctule, Nyctalus leisleri
    - Mountain noctule, Nyctalus montanus
    - Common noctule, Nyctalus noctula
    - Chinese noctule, Nyctalus plancyi
  - Genus Pipistrellus – Pipistrelles or Pipistrelle bats
    - Japanese pipistrelle, Pipistrellus abramus
    - Forest pipistrelle, Pipistrellus adamsi
    - Mount Gargues pipistrelle, Pipistrellus aero
    - Angulate pipistrelle, Pipistrellus angulatus
    - Kelaart's pipistrelle, Pipistrellus ceylonicus
    - Greater Papuan pipistrelle, Pipistrellus collinus
    - Indian pipistrelle, Pipistrellus coromandra
    - Crete pipistrelle, Pipistrellus creticus
    - Dhofar pipistrelle, Pipistrellus dhofarensis
    - Endo's pipistrelle, Pipistrellus endoi
    - Hanaki's dwarf bat, Pipistrellus hanaki
    - Dusky pipistrelle, Pipistrellus hesperidus
    - Aellen's pipistrelle, Pipistrellus inexspectatus
    - Java pipistrelle, Pipistrellus javanicus
    - Kuhl's pipistrelle, Pipistrellus kuhlii
    - Madeira pipistrelle, Pipistrellus maderensis
    - Minahassa pipistrelle, Pipistrellus minahassae
    - †Christmas Island pipistrelle, Pipistrellus murrayi
    - Tiny pipistrelle, Pipistrellus nanulus
    - Nathusius's pipistrelle, Pipistrellus nathusii
    - Lesser Papuan pipistrelle, Pipistrellus papuanus
    - Mount Popa pipistrelle, Pipistrellus paterculus
    - Dar es Salaam pipistrelle, Pipistrellus permixtus
    - Common pipistrelle, Pipistrellus pipistrellus
    - Soprano pipistrelle, Pipistrellus pygmaeus
    - Rusty pipistrelle, Pipistrellus rusticus
    - Simandou pipistrelle, Pipistrellus simandouensis
    - Narrow-winged pipistrelle, Pipistrellus stenopterus
    - †Sturdee's pipistrelle, Pipistrellus sturdeei
    - Least pipistrelle, Pipistrellus tenuis
    - Watts's pipistrelle, Pipistrellus wattsi
    - Northern pipistrelle, Pipistrellus westralis
  - Genus Scotoecus - house bats
    - White-bellied lesser house bat, Scotoecus albigula
    - Light-winged lesser house bat, Scotoecus albofuscus
    - Hinde's lesser house bat, Scotoecus hindei
    - Dark-winged lesser house bat, Scotoecus hirundo
    - Desert yellow bat, Scotoecus pallidus
  - Genus Scotozous
    - Dormer's bat, Scotozous dormeri
  - Genus Vansonia
    - Rüppell's bat, Vansonia rueppellii
- Tribe Plecotini
  - Genus Barbastella – barbastelles or barbastelle bats
    - Western barbastelle, Barbastella barbastellus
    - Beijing barbastelle, Barbastella beijingensis
    - Caspian barbastelle, Barbastella caspica
    - Eastern barbastelle or Asian barbastelle, Barbastella darjelingensis
    - Arabian barbastelle, Barbastella leucomelas
    - Japanese barbastelle, Barbastella pacifica
  - Genus Corynorhinus – American lump-nosed bats
    - Rafinesque's big-eared bat, Corynorhinus rafinesquii
    - Mexican big-eared bat, Corynorhinus mexicanus
    - Leon Paniagua's big-eared bat, Corynorhinus leonpaniaguae
    - Townsend's big-eared bat, Corynorhinus townsendii
  - Genus Euderma
    - Spotted bat, Euderma maculatum
  - Genus Idionycteris
    - Allen's big-eared bat, Idionycteris phyllotis
  - Genus Otonycteris
    - Desert long-eared bat, Otonycteris hemprichii
    - Turkestani long-eared bat, Otonycteris leucophaea
  - Genus Plecotus – lump-nosed bats
    - Brown long-eared bat, Plecotus auritus
    - Grey long-eared bat, Plecotus austriacus
    - Ethiopian long-eared bat, Plecotus balensis
    - Christie's long-eared bat, Plecotus christii
    - Gaisler's long-eared bat, Plecotus gaisleri
    - Himalayan long-eared bat, Plecotus homochrous
    - Mediterranean long-eared bat, Plecotus kolombatovici
    - Kozlov's long-eared bat, Plecotus kozlovi
    - Alpine long-eared bat, Plecotus macrobullaris
    - Ognev's long-eared bat Plecotus ognevi
    - Japanese long-eared bat, Plecotus sacrimontis
    - Sardinian long-eared bat, Plecotus sardus
    - Strelkov's long-eared bat, Plecotus strelkovi
    - Taiwan long-eared bat, Plecotus taivanus
    - Canary long-eared bat, Plecotus teneriffae
    - Turkmen long-eared bat, Plecotus turkmenicus
    - Ward's long-eared bat, Plecotus wardi
- Tribe Scotophilini
  - Genus Scotophilus – Old World yellow bats
    - East African yellow bat, Scotophilus altilis
    - Andrew Rebori's house bat, Scotophilus andrewreborii
    - Lesser yellow bat, Scotophilus borbonicus
    - Sulawesi yellow bat, Scotophilus celebensis
    - Eritrean yellow bat, Scotophilus colias
    - Sody's yellow bat, Scotophilus collinus
    - African yellow bat, Scotophilus dinganii
    - Ejeta's yellow bat, Scotophilus ejetai
    - Greater Asiatic yellow bat, Scotophilus heathi
    - Lesser Asiatic yellow bat, Scotophilus kuhlii
    - White-bellied yellow bat, Scotophilus leucogaster
    - Livingstone's yellow bat, Scotophilus livingstonii
    - Marovaza yellow bat, Scotophilus marovaza
    - Schreber's yellow bat, Scotophilus nigrita
    - Western greenish yellow bat, Scotophilus nigritellus
    - Robbins's yellow bat, Scotophilus nucella'
    - Nut-colored yellow bat, Scotophilus nux
    - Robust yellow bat, Scotophilus robustus
    - Malagasy yellow bat, Scotophilus tandrefana
    - Trujillo's yellow bat, Scotophilus trujilloi
    - Eastern greenish yellow bat, Scotophilus viridis
- Tribe Vespertilionini
  - Genus Afronycteris
    - Heller's serotine, Afronycteris helios
    - Banana serotine, Afronycteris nanus
  - Genus Cassistrellus – helmeted bats
    - Surat helmeted bat, Cassistrellus dimissus
    - Yok Don helmeted bat, Cassistrellus yokdonensis
  - Genus Chalinolobus – wattled bats
    - Large-eared pied bat, Chalinolobus dwyeri
    - Gould's wattled bat, Chalinolobus gouldii
    - Chocolate wattled bat, Chalinolobus morio
    - New Caledonian wattled bat, Chalinolobus neocaledonicus
    - Hoary wattled bat, Chalinolobus nigrogriseus
    - Coastal lobe-lipped bat or coastal wattled bat, Chalinolobus orarius
    - Little pied bat, Chalinolobus picatus
    - New Zealand long-tailed bat or long-tailed wattled bat, Chalinolobus tuberculatus
  - Genus Falsistrellus – false pipistrelles
    - Western false pipistrelle, Falsistrellus mackenziei
    - Eastern false pipistrelle, Falsistrellus tasmaniensis
  - Genus Hypsugo – Asian pipistrelles
    - Chocolate pipistrelle, Hypsugo affinis
    - Alashanian pipistrelle, Hypsugo alaschanicus
    - Arabian pipistrelle, Hypsugo arabicus
    - Desert pipistrelle, Hypsugo ariel
    - Bodenheimer's pipistrelle, Hypsugo bodenheimeri
    - Cadorna's pipistrelle, Hypsugo cadornae
    - Long-toothed pipistrelle, Hypsugo dolichodon
    - Brown pipistrelle, Hypsugo imbricatus
    - Red-brown pipistrelle, Hypsugo kitcheneri
    - Socotran pipistrelle or Lanza's pipistrelle, Hypsugo lanzai
    - Burma pipistrelle, Hypsugo lophurus
    - Big-eared pipistrelle, Hypsugo macrotis
    - Pungent pipistrelle, Hypsugo mordax
    - Mouselike pipistrelle, Hypsugo musciculus
    - Peters's pipistrelle, Hypsugo petersi
    - Chinese pipistrelle, Hypsugo pulveratus
    - Savi's pipistrelle, Hypsugo savii
    - Vordermann's pipistrelle, Hypsugo vordermanni
  - Genus Laephotis – long-eared bats
    - Angolan long-eared bat, Laephotis angolensis
    - Botswanan long-eared bat, Laephotis botswanae
    - Cape serotine, Laeophotis capensis
    - East African serotine, Laephotis kirinyaga
    - Isalo serotine, Laephotis malagasyensis
    - Malagasy serotine, Laephotis matroka
    - Namib long-eared bat, Laephotis namibensis
    - Roberts's serotine, Laephotis robertsi
    - Stanley's serotine, Laephotis stanleyi
    - De Winton's long-eared bat, Laephotis wintoni
  - Genus Mimetillus
    - Moloney's mimic bat, Mimetillus moloneyi
    - Thomas's mimic bat, Mimetillus thomasi
  - Genus Mirostrellus
    - Joffre's bat, Mirostrellus joffrei
  - Genus Neoromicia
    - Anchieta's serotine, Neoromicia anchietae
    - Kirindy serotine, Neoromicia bemainty
    - Yellow serotine, Neoromicia flavescens
    - Tiny serotine, Neoromicia guineensis
    - Melck's house bat, Neoromicia melckorum
    - Somali serotine, Neoromicia somalica
    - Zulu serotine, Neoromicia zuluensis
  - Genus Nycticeinops
    - Bellier's serotine, Nycticeinops bellieri
    - Broad-headed serotine, Nycticeinops crassulus
    - Eisentraut's serotine, Nycticeinops eisentrauti
    - Grandidier's serotine, Nycticeinops grandidieri
    - Happolds's serotine, Nycticeinops happoldorum
    - Large-headed serotine, Nycticeinops macrocephalus
    - Schlieffen's serotine, Nycticeinops schlieffeni
  - Genus Nyctophilus – New Guinean and Australian big-eared bats
    - Northern long-eared bat, Nyctophilus arnhemensis
    - Eastern long-eared bat, Nyctophilus bifax
    - South-eastern long-eared bat, Nyctophilus corbeni
    - Pallid long-eared bat, Nyctophilus daedalus
    - Lesser long-eared bat, Nyctophilus geoffroyi
    - Gould's long-eared bat, Nyctophilus gouldi
    - Sunda long-eared bat, Nyctophilus heran
    - †Lord Howe long-eared bat, Nyctophilus howensis
    - Holts' long-eared bat, Nyctophilus holtorum
    - Small-toothed long-eared bat, Nyctophilus microdon
    - New Guinea long-eared bat, Nyctophilus microtis
    - New Caledonian long-eared bat, Nyctophilus nebulosus
    - Greater long-eared bat, Nyctophilus timoriensis
    - Western long-eared bat, Nyctophilus major
    - Tasmanian long-eared bat, Nyctophilus sherrini
    - Mt. Missim long-eared bat, Nyctophilus shirleyae
    - Pygmy long-eared bat, Nyctophilus walkeri
  - Genus Pharotis
    - New Guinea big-eared bat, Pharotis imogene
  - Genus Philetor
    - Rohu's bat, Philetor brachypterus
  - Genus Pseudoromicia
    - Dark-brown serotine, Pseudoromicia brunnea
    - Isabelline serotine, Pseudoromicia isabella
    - Kityo's serotine, Pseudoromicia kityoi
    - Nyanza serotine, Pseudoromicia nyanza
    - Rendall's serotine, Pseudoromicia rendalli
    - Rosevear's serotine, Pseudoromicia roseveari
    - White-winged serotine, Pseudoromicia tenuipinnis
  - Genus Tylonycteris – bamboo bats
    - Amber bamboo bat, Tylonycteris fulvida
    - Malayan bamboo bat, Tylonycteris malayana
    - Lesser bamboo bat, Tylonycteris pachypus
    - Pygmy bamboo bat, Tylonycteris pygmaeus
    - Greater bamboo bat, Tylonycteris robustula
    - Tonkin bamboo bat, Tylonycteris tonkinensis
  - Genus Vespadelus
    - Inland forest bat, Vespadelus baverstocki
    - Northern cave bat, Vespadelus caurinus
    - Large forest bat, Vespadelus darlingtoni
    - Yellow-lipped bat, Vespadelus douglasorum
    - Finlayson's cave bat, Vespadelus finlaysoni
    - Eastern forest bat, Vespadelus pumilus
    - Southern forest bat, Vespadelus regulus
    - Troughton's forest bat, Vespadelus troughtoni
    - Little forest bat, Vespadelus vulturnus
  - Genus Vespertilio – frosted bats
    - Parti-coloured bat, Vespertilio murinus
    - Asian parti-colored bat, Vespertilio sinensis
