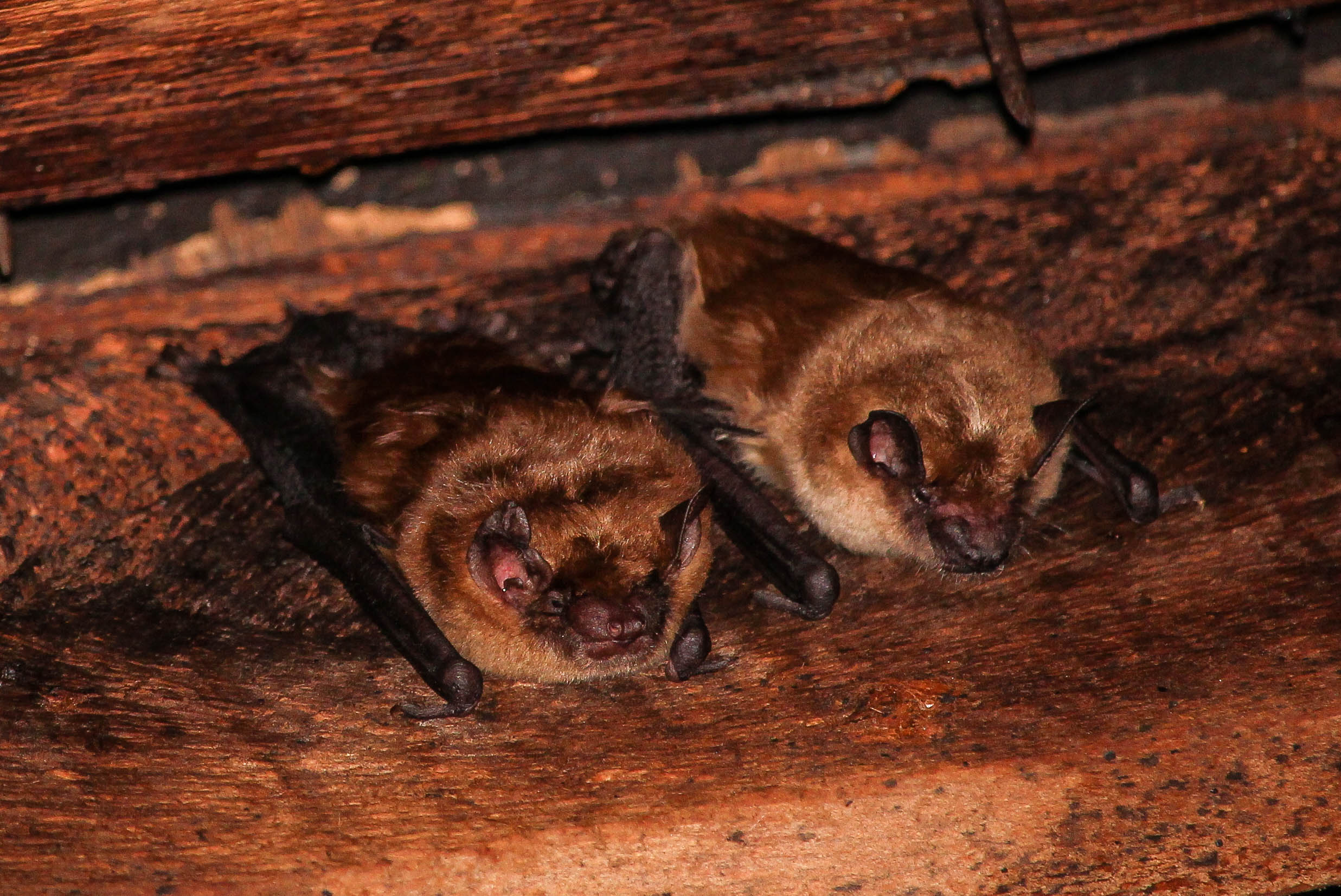
- Big brown bats (Eptesicus fuscus)

Scientific classification
- Kingdom: Animalia
- Phylum: Chordata
- Class: Mammalia
- Order: Chiroptera
- Family: Vespertilionidae
- Subfamily: Vespertilioninae
- Tribe: Eptesicini; Volleth and Heller, 1994

Species
- See text

= Eptesicini =

Tribe of bats

Eptescini is a tribe of bats in the family Vespertilionidae. This tribe has a cosmopolitan distribution.

== Species ==
Species in the tribe include:

- Genus Arielulus
  - Bronze sprite, Arielulus circumdatus
  - Coppery sprite, Arielulus cuprosus
  - Social sprite, Arielulus societatis
- Genus Eptesicus – house bats
  - Anatolian serotine, Eptesicus anatolicus
  - Little black serotine, Eptesicus andinus
  - Bobrinski's serotine, Eptesicus bobrinskoi
  - Botta's serotine, Eptesicus bottae
  - Brazilian brown bat, Eptesicus brasiliensis
  - Chiriquinan serotine, Eptesicus chiriquinus
  - Diminutive serotine, Eptesicus diminutus
  - Horn-skinned bat, Eptesicus floweri
  - Argentine brown bat, Eptesicus furinalis
  - Big brown bat, Eptesicus fuscus
  - Gobi big brown bat, Eptesicus gobiensis
  - Guadeloupe big brown bat, Eptesicus guadeloupensis
  - Long-tailed house bat, Eptesicus hottentotus
  - Harmless serotine, Eptesicus innoxius
  - Meridional serotine, Eptesicus isabellinus
  - Japanese short-tailed bat, Eptesicus japonensis
  - Kobayashi's bat, Eptesicus kobayashii
  - Langer's serotine, Eptesicus langeri
  - Eptesicus lobatus
  - Northern bat, Eptesicus nilssonii
  - Ognev's serotine, Eptesicus ognevi
  - Orinoco serotine (Eptesicus orinocensis)
  - Oriental serotine, Eptesicus pachyomus
  - Thick-eared bat, Eptesicus pachyotis
  - Lagos serotine, Eptesicus platyops
  - Serotine bat, Eptesicus serotinus
  - Taddei's serotine, Eptesicus taddeii
  - Sombre bat, Eptesicus tatei
  - Ulapes serotine, Eptesicus ulapesensis
- Genus Glauconycteris – butterfly bats
  - Allen's striped bat, Glauconycteris alboguttata
  - Silvered bat, Glauconycteris argentata
  - Blackish butterfly bat, Glauconycteris atra
  - Beatrix's bat, Glauconycteris beatrix
  - Curry's bat, Glauconycteris curryae
  - Bibundi bat, Glauconycteris egeria
  - Glen's wattled bat, Glauconycteris gleni
  - Allen's spotted bat, Glauconycteris humeralis
  - Kenyan wattled bat, Glauconycteris kenyacola
  - Machado's butterfly bat, Glauconycteris machadoi
  - Abo bat, Glauconycteris poensis
  - Pied butterfly bat, Glauconycteris superba
  - Variegated butterfly bat, Glauconycteris variegata
- Genus Hesperoptenus – false serotine bats
  - Blanford's bat, Hesperoptenus blanfordi
  - False serotine bat, Hesperoptenus doriae
  - Gaskell's false serotine, Hesperoptenus gaskelli
  - Tickell's bat, Hesperoptenus tickelli
  - Large false serotine, Hesperoptenus tomesi
- Genus Histiotus – big-eared brown bats
  - Strange big-eared brown bat, Histiotus alienus
  - Cadena-García's big-eared brown bat, Histiotus cadenai
  - Colombian big-eared brown bat, Histiotus colombiae
  - Transparent-winged big-eared brown bat, Histiotus diaphanopterus
  - Humboldt big-eared brown bat, Histiotus humboldti
  - Thomas's big-eared brown bat, Histiotus laephotis
  - Big-eared brown bat, Histiotus macrotus
  - Southern big-eared brown bat, Histiotus magellanicus
  - Moche big-eared brown bat, Histiotus mochica
  - Small big-eared brown bat, Histiotus montanus
  - Tropical big-eared brown bat, Histiotus velatus
- Genus Ia
  - Great evening bat, Ia io
- Genus Lasionycteris
  - Silver-haired bat, Lasionycteris noctivagans
- Genus Scoteanax
  - Rüppell's broad-nosed bat, Scoteanax rueppellii
- Genus Scotomanes
  - Harlequin bat, Scotomanes ornatus
- Genus Scotorepens - lesser broad-nosed bats
  - Inland broad-nosed bat, Scotorepens balstoni
  - Little broad-nosed bat, Scotorepens greyii
  - Eastern broad-nosed bat, Scotorepens orion
  - Northern broad-nosed bat, Scotorepens sanborni
- Genus Thainycteris
  - Collared sprite, Thainycteris aureocollaris
  - Necklace sprite, Thainycteris torquatus
