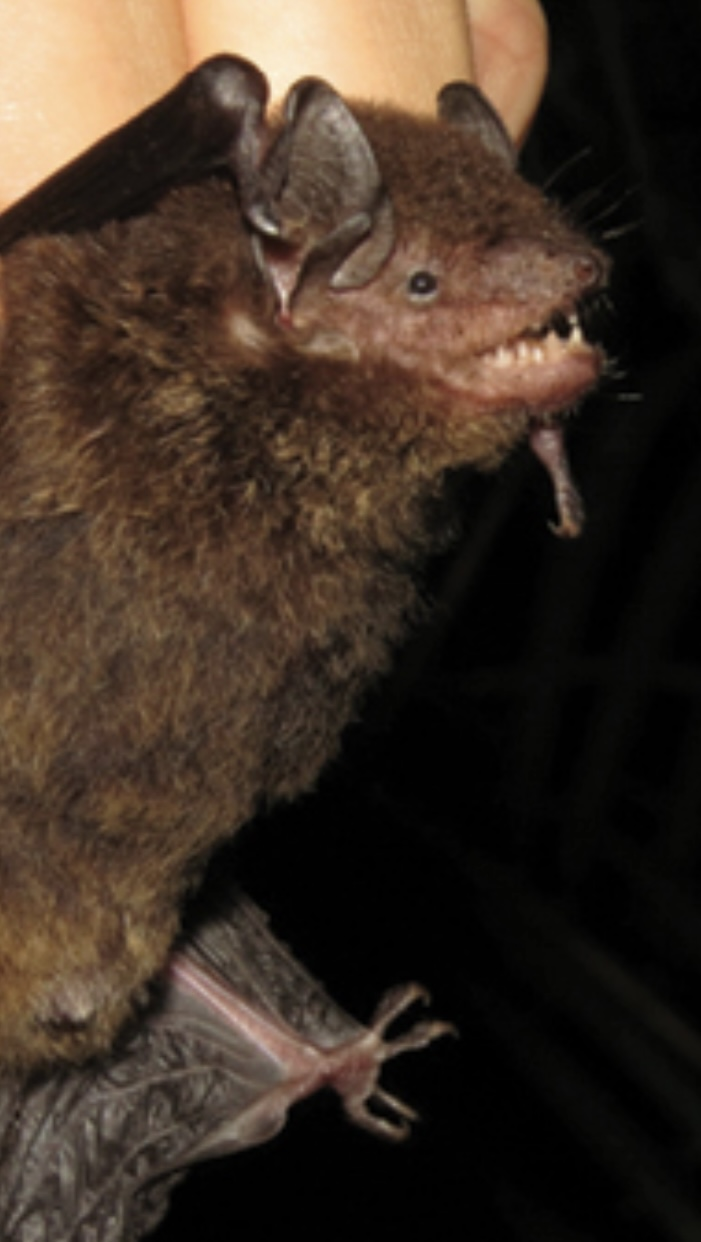

Conservation status
- Least Concern (IUCN 3.1)

Scientific classification
- Kingdom: Animalia
- Phylum: Chordata
- Class: Mammalia
- Order: Chiroptera
- Family: Vespertilionidae
- Genus: Eptesicus
- Species: E. chiriquinus

Binomial name
- Eptesicus chiriquinus Simmons & Voss, 1998

Synonyms
- E. inca (Thomas 1920)

= Chiriquinan serotine =

Species of bat

The Chiriquinan serotine (Eptesicus chiriquinus) is a species of house bat.

The Chiriquinan serotine is listed as Least Concern on the IUCN Red List due to its wide distribution and the unlikelihood of its speedy decline. However, the species is poorly known and may be rare. Its worst known threat is habitat modification, and it has been known to exist in protected areas.

The Chiriquinan serotine is found in Costa Rica, Panama, Colombia, Ecuador, Peru, Venezuela, Guyana, French Guiana, and Amazônia Legal. Its type locality is in Boquete, Chiriquí from an elevation of 4,000 ft (1,200 m). The species is an insectivore and is likely forest-dependent. It prefers moist habitats, montane tropical forests, or evergreen forests.

It is considered to be distinct from the little black serotine and the Brazilian brown bat. The IUCN Red List includes Eptesicus montosus with the Chiriquinan serotine.

== See also ==
- Little black serotine
- Brazilian brown bat
