= Thainycteris =

Scientific classification
- Kingdom: Animalia
- Phylum: Chordata
- Class: Mammalia
- Order: Chiroptera
- Family: Vespertilionidae
- Tribe: Eptesicini
- Genus: Thainycteris; Kock & Storch, 1996

Species
- T. aureocollaris T. torquatus

Genus of bat

Thainycteris is a genus of vesper bat with two species, one found in Indochina and the other found in Taiwan. Its members were previously classified within Arielulus, but more recent studies support Thainycteris as being a distinct genus.

There are two species in this genus:

- Collared sprite (T. aureocollaris)
- Necklace sprite (T. torquatus)
