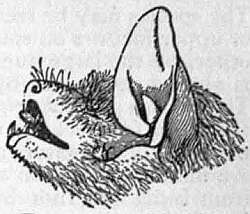

Conservation status
- Least Concern (IUCN 3.1)

Scientific classification
- Kingdom: Animalia
- Phylum: Chordata
- Class: Mammalia
- Order: Chiroptera
- Family: Vespertilionidae
- Tribe: Eptesicini
- Genus: Scotomanes; Dobson, 1875
- Species: S. ornatus

Binomial name
- Scotomanes ornatus (Blyth, 1851)
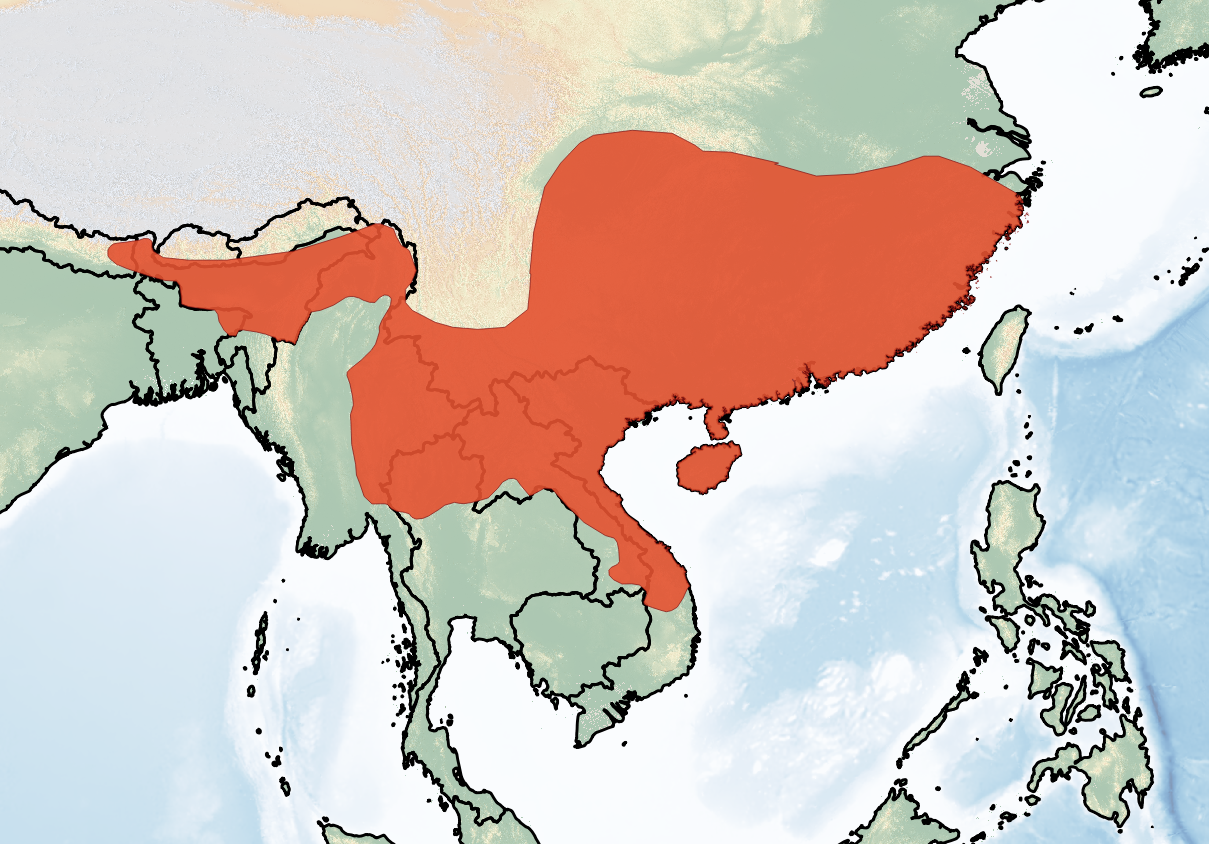

Synonyms
- Nycticejus emarginatus; Nycticejus nivicolus; Nycticejus ornatus; Scotomanes emarginatus

= Harlequin bat =

Species of bat

The harlequin bat (Scotomanes ornatus) is a species of bat in the family Vespertilionidae, the vesper bats. It is the only member of the genus Scotomanes.

The harlequin bat is found in south-eastern Asia from India to China and Vietnam. It is a common and widespread species that lives in forests and caves and roosts in trees.
