= Guadeloupe big brown bat =

Conservation status
- Endangered (IUCN 3.1)

Scientific classification
- Kingdom: Animalia
- Phylum: Chordata
- Class: Mammalia
- Order: Chiroptera
- Family: Vespertilionidae
- Genus: Eptesicus
- Species: E. guadeloupensis

Binomial name
- Eptesicus guadeloupensis Genoways & Baker, 1975

Species of bat

The Guadeloupe big brown bat (Eptesicus guadeloupensis) is a species of vesper bat. It is found only on the island of Guadeloupe. It is one of the eleven species of bat found on Guadeloupe, and one of three that are endemic.

== Taxonomy and etymology ==
It was described by Genoways and Baker in 1975. The holotype used for the species description was collected in July 1974 by the authors in eastern Baie-Mahault of Guadeloupe. They believed that it was most closely related to the big brown bat, Eptesicus fuscus. They placed it in the fuscus group of the genus Eptesicus, as defined by Davis in 1966. Before the description of the Guadeloupe big brown bat, the only other member of the fuscus group was its identifier, Eptesicus fuscus: the big brown bat. Its species name guadeloupensis is a Latinized version of Guadeloupe, where the bat is found.

== Description ==
It is the largest member of its genus that occurs in the New World. Its wing membranes are black in color. Its fur is bicolored, with individual hairs black at the base and lighter at the tip. The hairs are chocolate brown at the tip on its back, and [[buff colour)|buffy]] at the tip on its belly. From snout to tail, it is 129–133 mm (5.1–5.2 in) long. Its forearm is 49.6–51.5 mm (1.95–2.03 in) long. Ears are 22.5–24 mm (0.89–0.94 in) long, tail is 54–60 mm (2.1–2.4 in) long, and hind foot is 11–14 mm (0.43–0.55 in) long.

== Biology ==
Like all other members of its genus, it is diploid with 50 chromosomes and a Fundamental number of 48. It is insectivorous. During the day, it is thought to roost in trees within gallery forests. It is infrequently encountered, therefore little is known about its reproduction. A post-lactating female and a juvenile female were once encountered in late July, suggesting that females could give birth in May or June.

== Range and habitat ==
It is endemic to the Basse-Terre Island of Guadeloupe, which is in the Lesser Antilles of the Caribbean. It is encountered in tropical rainforests and gallery forests. It is most often found at low elevations, from 0–300 m (0–984 ft) above sea level.

== Conservation ==
It is currently listed as endangered by the IUCN. Major threats to this species include habitat loss, hurricanes, and the spread of exotic, invasive species such as rats, mice, and mongooses. It may also be threatened by competition with the native velvety free-tailed bat, which is abundant.
