= Kobayashi's bat =

Conservation status
- Data Deficient (IUCN 3.1)

Scientific classification
- Kingdom: Animalia
- Phylum: Chordata
- Class: Mammalia
- Order: Chiroptera
- Family: Vespertilionidae
- Genus: Eptesicus
- Species: E. koyabashii

Binomial name
- Eptesicus koyabashii (Mori, 1928)
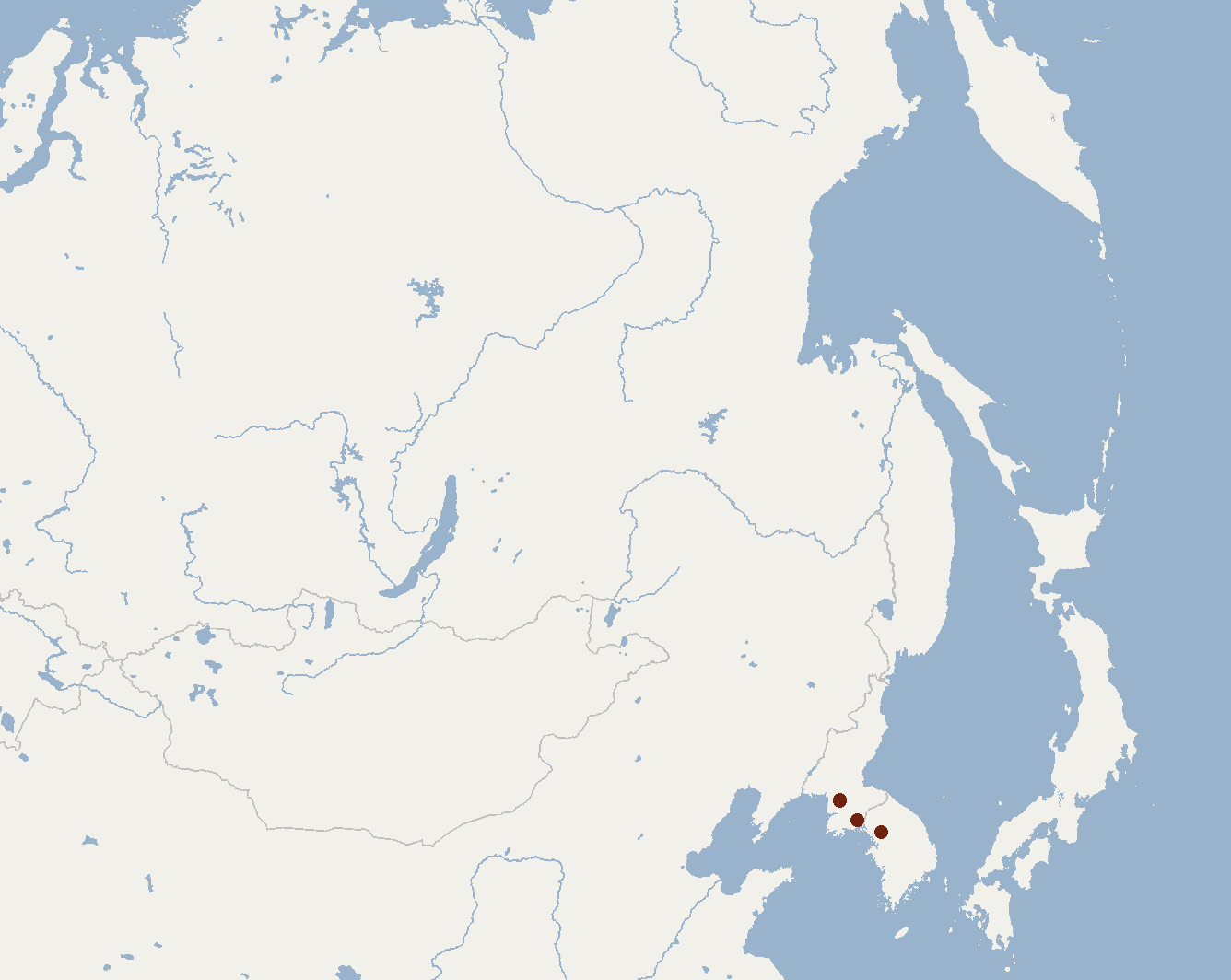

Species of bat

Kobayashi's bat (Eptesicus kobayashii) is a species of bat. An adult Kobayashi's bat has a body length of 6.0–6.3 centimetres (2.4–2.5 in), a tail length of 4.6–4.8 centimetres (1.8–1.9 in), and a wing length of 4.5–4.7 centimetres (1.8–1.9 in). The species is found only on the Korean Peninsula; it has been suggested that it may be a local form of Eptesicus bottae, Botta's serotine.
