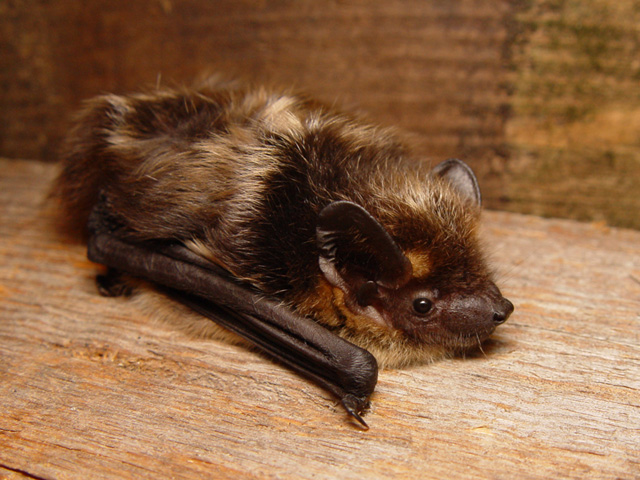
- Northern bat (Eptesicus nilssoni)

Scientific classification
- Kingdom: Animalia
- Phylum: Chordata
- Class: Mammalia
- Order: Chiroptera
- Family: Vespertilionidae
- Tribe: Eptesicini
- Genus: Eptesicus; Rafinesque, 1820

Type species
- Eptesicus melanops Rafinesque, 1820

= Eptesicus =

Genus of bats

Eptesicus is a genus of bats, commonly called house bats or serotine bats, in the family Vespertilionidae. The genus name is likely derived from the Greek words ptetikos 'able to fly' or petomai 'house flier', although this is not certain.

== Species ==
=== Traditional ===
The following species have traditionally been placed in Eptesicus

- Anatolian serotine (Eptesicus anatolicus)
- Little black serotine (Eptesicus andinus)
- Bobrinski's serotine (Eptesicus bobrinskoi)
- Botta's serotine (Eptesicus bottae)
- Brazilian brown bat (Eptesicus brasiliensis)
- Chiriquinan serotine (Eptesicus chiriquinus)
- Diminutive serotine (Eptesicus diminutus)
- Horn-skinned bat (Eptesicus floweri)
- Argentine brown bat (Eptesicus furinalis)
- Big brown bat (Eptesicus fuscus)
- Gobi big brown bat (Eptesicus gobiensis)
- Guadeloupe big brown bat (Eptesicus guadeloupensis)
- Long-tailed house bat (Eptesicus hottentotus)
- Harmless serotine (Eptesicus innoxius)
- Meridional serotine (Eptesicus isabellinus)
- Japanese short-tailed bat (Eptesicus japonensis)
- Kobayashi's bat (Eptesicus kobayashii)
- Langer's serotine (Eptesicus langeri)
- Eptesicus lobatus
- Northern bat (Eptesicus nilssonii)
- Ognev's serotine (Eptesicus ognevi)
- Orinoco serotine (Eptesicus orinocensis)
- Oriental serotine (Eptesicus pachyomus)
- Thick-eared bat (Eptesicus pachyotis)
- Lagos serotine (Eptesicus platyops)
- Serotine bat (Eptesicus serotinus)
- Taddei's serotine (Eptesicus taddeii)
- Sombre bat (Eptesicus tatei)
- Ulapes serotine (Eptesicus ulapesensis)

=== 2023 proposed revision ===
A 2023 study noted divisions within Eptesicus when considering physical characteristics, genetics, echolocation characteristics, and divergence timing, with the authors concluding that Eptesicus should be split into three genera. They described a new genus, Neoeptesicus, and elevated the subgenus Cnephaeus to genus rank.

The Old World Eptesicus species were moved to Cnephaeus:

- Cnephaeus anatolicus
- Cnephaeus bottae
- Cnephaeus floweri
- Cnephaeus gobiensis
- Cnephaeus hottentotus
- Cnephaeus isabellinus
- Cnephaeus japonensis
- Cnephaeus kobayashii
- Cnephaeus nilssonii
- Cnephaeus ognevi
- Cnephaeus pachyomus
- Cnephaeus pachyotis
- Cnephaeus platyops
- Cnephaeus serotinus
- Cnephaeus tatei

The Neotropical species were placed in Neoeptesicus:

- Neoeptesicus andinus
- Neoeptesicus brasiliensis
- Neoeptesicus chiriquinus
- Neoeptesicus diminutus
- Neoeptesicus furinalis
- Neoeptesicus innoxius
- Neoeptesicus langeri
- Neoeptesicus orinocensis
- Neoeptesicus taddeii
- Neoeptesicus ulapesensis

These revisions left only two species in Eptesicus:

- Eptesicus fuscus
- Eptesicus guadeloupensis
