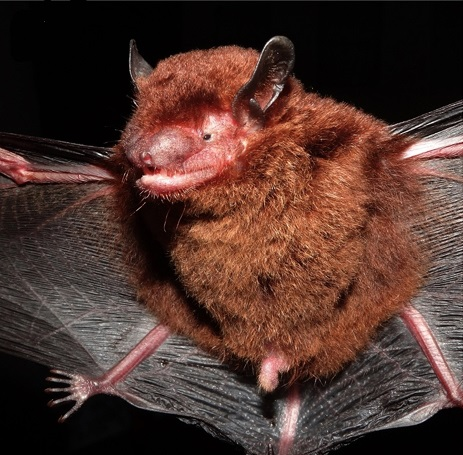

Conservation status
- Data Deficient (IUCN 3.1)

Scientific classification
- Kingdom: Animalia
- Phylum: Chordata
- Class: Mammalia
- Order: Chiroptera
- Family: Vespertilionidae
- Genus: Eptesicus
- Species: E. taddeii

Binomial name
- Eptesicus taddeii Miranda, Bernardi & Passos, 2006

= Taddei's serotine =

Species of bat

Taddei's serotine (Eptesicus taddeii) is a species of medium-sized bat belonging to the family Vespertilionidae. It is restricted to the Atlantic Forest of southern Brazil.

The bat has a total length of up to 120 millimetres (4.7 in) and is most similar to Eptesicus brasiliensis but can be distinguished from that species by its more robust appearance, redder colouring, larger muzzle and rounder-shaped ears. The specific name honours the Brazilian zoologist Valdir Antônio Taddei.
