= Necklace sprite =

Conservation status
- Least Concern (IUCN 3.1)

Scientific classification
- Kingdom: Animalia
- Phylum: Chordata
- Class: Mammalia
- Order: Chiroptera
- Family: Vespertilionidae
- Genus: Thainycteris
- Species: T. torquata

Binomial name
- Thainycteris torquata (Csorba & Lee, 1999)
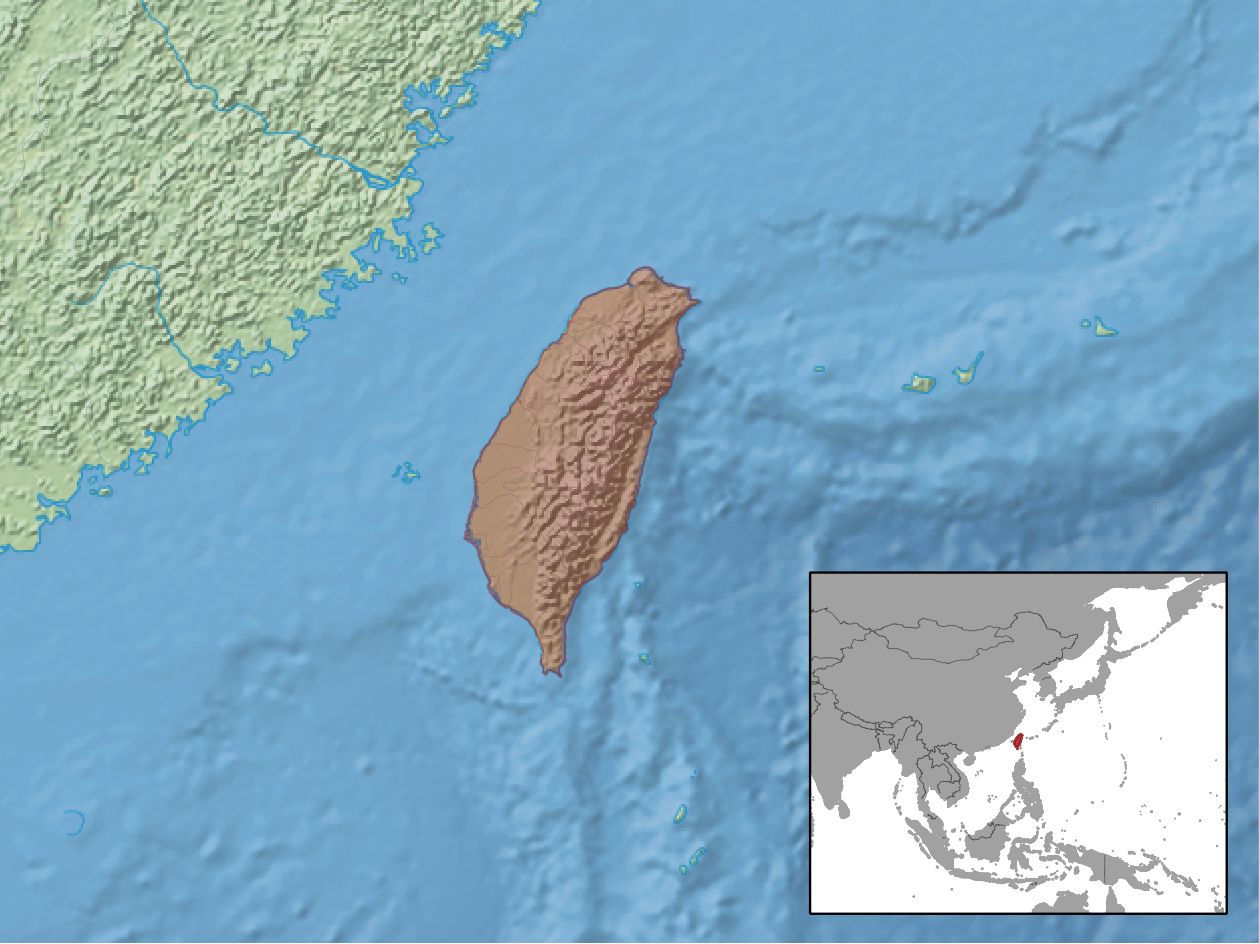

Synonyms
- Arielulus torquatus

Species of bat

The necklace sprite or necklace pipistrelle (Thainycteris torquata) is a species of vesper bat that is endemic to Taiwan.
