= Collared sprite =

Conservation status
- Least Concern (IUCN 3.1)

Scientific classification
- Kingdom: Animalia
- Phylum: Chordata
- Class: Mammalia
- Order: Chiroptera
- Family: Vespertilionidae
- Genus: Thainycteris
- Species: T. aureocollaris

Binomial name
- Thainycteris aureocollaris Kock & Storch, 1996
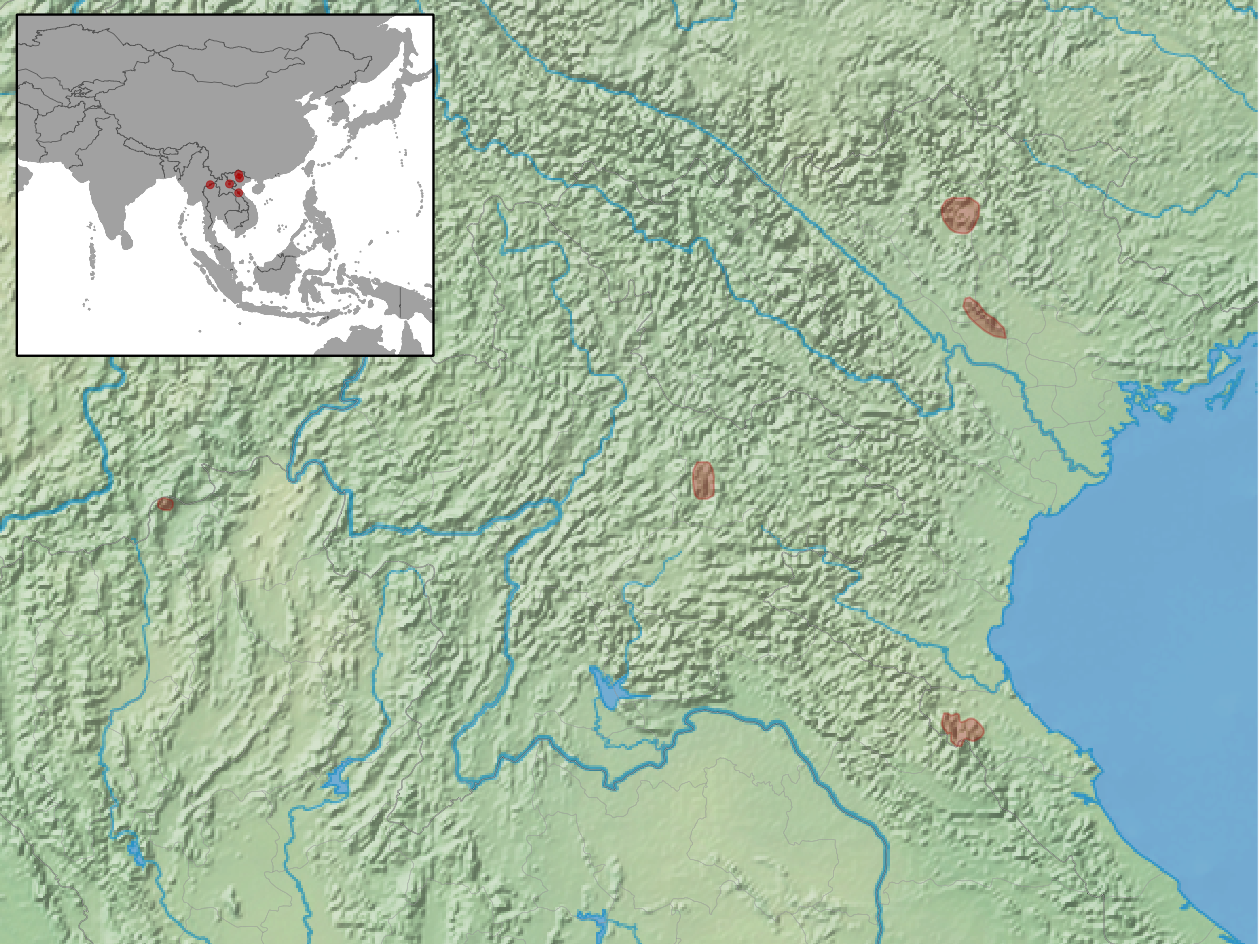

Synonyms
- Arielulus aureocollaris

Species of bat

The collared sprite or collared pipistrelle (Thainycteris aureocollaris) is a species of vesper bat found in Laos and Thailand.
