= Eptesicus anatolicus =

Conservation status
- Least Concern (IUCN 3.1)

Scientific classification
- Kingdom: Animalia
- Phylum: Chordata
- Class: Mammalia
- Order: Chiroptera
- Family: Vespertilionidae
- Genus: Eptesicus
- Species: E. anatolicus

Binomial name
- Eptesicus anatolicus Felten, 1971

Species of bat

The Anatolian serotine bat (Eptesicus anatolicus) is a species of bat found in West Asia.

== Taxonomy ==
Eptesicus anatolicus was described in 1971 by Felten. However, a statement few years later from Harrison, who considered the specimens he examined as a sub-species of Eptesicus bottae, was accepted as taxonomical reference for more than three decades. In 2006, Benda et al. suggested that Eptesicus anatolicus should regain a species status following clear morphological evidence.

== Range and habitat ==
This bat is known to forage in open areas, around streetlamps and in the semi-open area along cliffs and vegetation. This species is recorded in Turkey, Syria, Greece (Rhodes Island), Cyprus and Iran.

This species is listed in the Berne Convention and is specifically targeted by the UNEP-EUROBATS convention.

== Literature cited ==
- Benda, P., Andreas, M., Kock, D., Lucan, R. K., Munclinger, P., Nova, P., ... & Weinfurtova, D. (2006).Bats(Mammalia: Chiroptera) of the Eastern Mediterranean. Part 4. Bat fauna of Syria: distribution, systematics, ecology. Acta Societatis Zoologicae Bohemicae, 70(1), 1–329.
- Benda, P., Faizolâhi, K., Andreas, M., Obuch, J., Reiter, A., Ševčík, M., Uhrin, M., Vallo, P., & Ashrafi, S. 2012.Bats (Mammalia: Chiroptera) of the Eastern Mediterranean and Middle East. Part 10. Bat fauna of Iran. Acta Societatis Zoologicae Bohemicae, 76(1-4), 163–582.
- Dietz C., VonhelVersen O. & nill D. 2007: Handbuch der Fledermäuse Europas und Nordwestafrikas. Biologie– Kennzeichen – Gefährdung. Stuttgart: Franckh-Kosmos Verlags GmbH & Co. KG, 399 pp.
