= Eptesicus lobatus =

Conservation status
- Data Deficient (IUCN 3.1)

Scientific classification
- Kingdom: Animalia
- Phylum: Chordata
- Class: Mammalia
- Order: Chiroptera
- Family: Vespertilionidae
- Genus: Eptesicus
- Species: E. lobatus

Binomial name
- Eptesicus lobatus Zagorodniuk, 2009

Species of bat

Eptesicus lobatus is a species of bat of genus Eptesicus and family Vespertilionidae.

== Taxon history ==
All representative of genus Eptesicus from eastern and southern parts of Ukraine used to be referred to the species Eptesicus serotinus before, a new species was split from serotinus. A species was described by Ukrainian zoologist (theorist) Igor Zagorodniuk in 2009 as a new species based on the material from Luhansk Oblast. The taxonomy revision was conducted because of various mistakes in identification of Eptesicus species (as well as adjacent species, in particular Vespertili) which occurred based on available identification guides.

The primary Ukrainian name of the species (ukr. Пергач донецький) is associated with the Siverskyi Donets river, where most of the records of the species were known at the time of its description. As conceived in the species description, its name remained geographic but would be changed when the information on the species range would be expanded. The Latin name is associated with the presence of a post-calcarial lobe on a calcar.

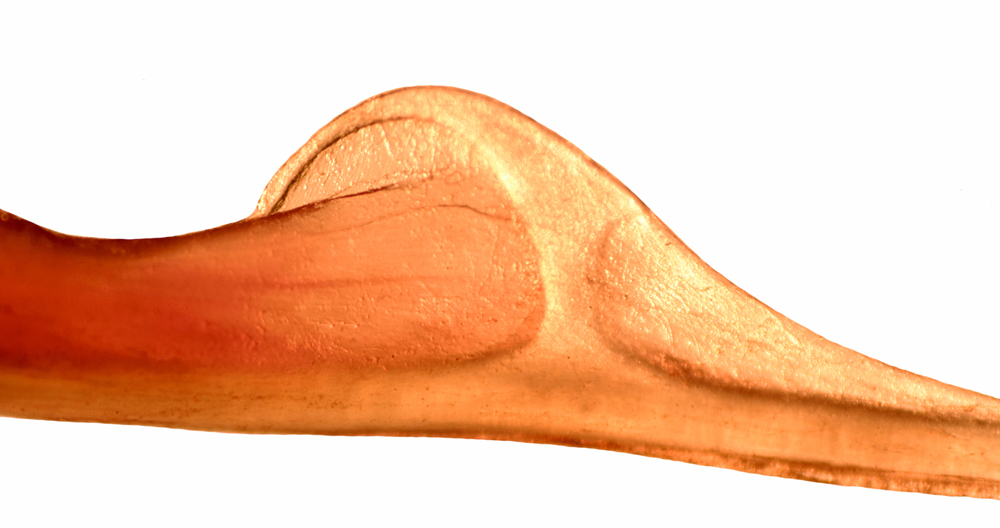
the anatomy of the post-calcarial lobe of Eptesicus lobatus

== Species characteristic features ==
The basis for the description was some morphological features of Eptesicus species from eastern species, which did not match the diagnosis of Eptesicus serotinus and genus Eptesicus in general. The key feature of the species is the presence of post-calcarial lobe in a calcar. According to all available literature sources, the post-calcarial lobe is not developed in the species of the genus Eptesicus; or absent, or looks like a narrow skin fold (see photo)

== Distribution ==
Typical samples originated from several localities of Luhansk Oblast: Krasnodon city, Kolesnykivka village, "Novo-Il'yenko" Biological Station in Stanytsia-Luhanska Raion, surroundings of village Gannivka in Starobilsk Raion, near Brianka. The typical series are stored at Benedict Dybowski Zoological Museum (University of Lviv). The known species range covers the basin of Siverskyi Donets River and the adjacent areas of Donets Ridge. It is assumed that the range of the species extends on East to Don and on South to North Caucasus and Pryazovia.

== Ecology ==
A species is a typical inhabitant of the urban landscape, belongs to synanthropes. The most of records in repositories are associated with buildings (window frames, window sills, ceiling coverings, etc.). The species is easily recorded by ultrasound (approx. 25–29 kHz with a characteristic "drawing" of the sound). It is common in park areas, greened courtyards. It feeds mostly by catching large insects in flight.

== Role in zoonoses ==
The species range coincides with the majority of known cases of bat-to-human rabies transmission in Ukraine and in Europe in general. In particular, outbreaks have occurred in Kharkiv in 1985, Luhansk in 1997, and in Krasnodon in 2002.

In 2013 the presence of rabies virus was confirmed in a colony of a typical site (Novo-Il'yenko Biological Station). Most likely, the rabies refers to the species EBLV1 (European Bat lyssavirus 1).
