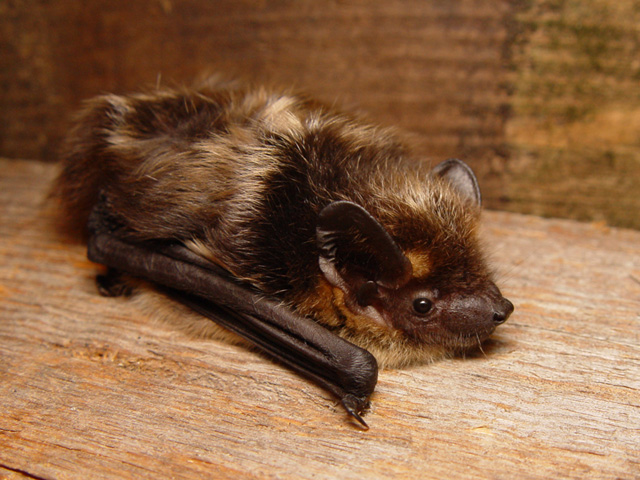
- A northern bat, crawling on a wooden surface

Conservation status
- Least Concern (IUCN 3.1)

Scientific classification
- Kingdom: Animalia
- Phylum: Chordata
- Class: Mammalia
- Order: Chiroptera
- Family: Vespertilionidae
- Genus: Eptesicus
- Species: E. nilssonii

Binomial name
- Eptesicus nilssonii (Keyserling et Blasius, 1839)
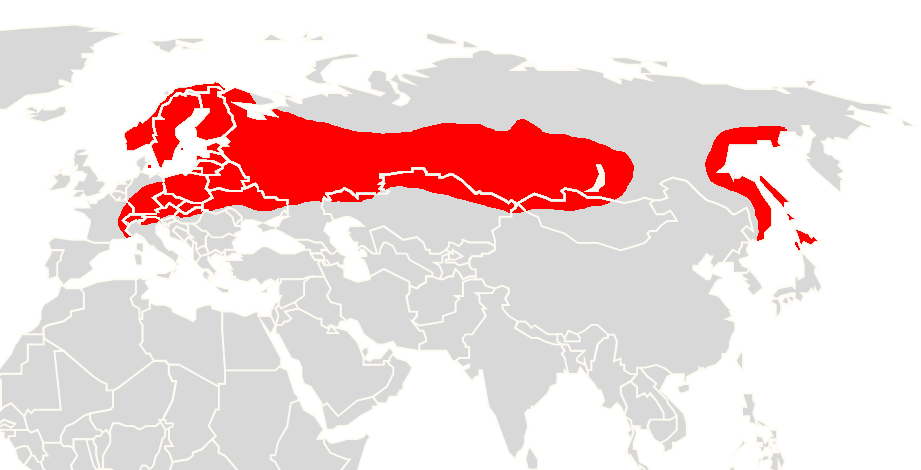

= Northern bat =

Species of bat

The northern bat (Eptesicus nilssonii) is the most abundant species of bat in northern Eurasia occurring from France to Hokkaidō and south to Kazakhstan.

== Description ==
The northern bat is dark brown or black with some gold touched at the tip of the hairs in the head and back region. Its nose, ears, tail and wings are black or blackish brown. The coat on the ventral side is yellowish brown. It has short and rounded ears. It body length is 54–64 mm (2.1–2.5 in) with a wing span of 240–280 mm (9.4–11.0 in), and it weighs 8–16 g (0.28–0.56 oz) depending on the season.

== Distribution and habitat ==
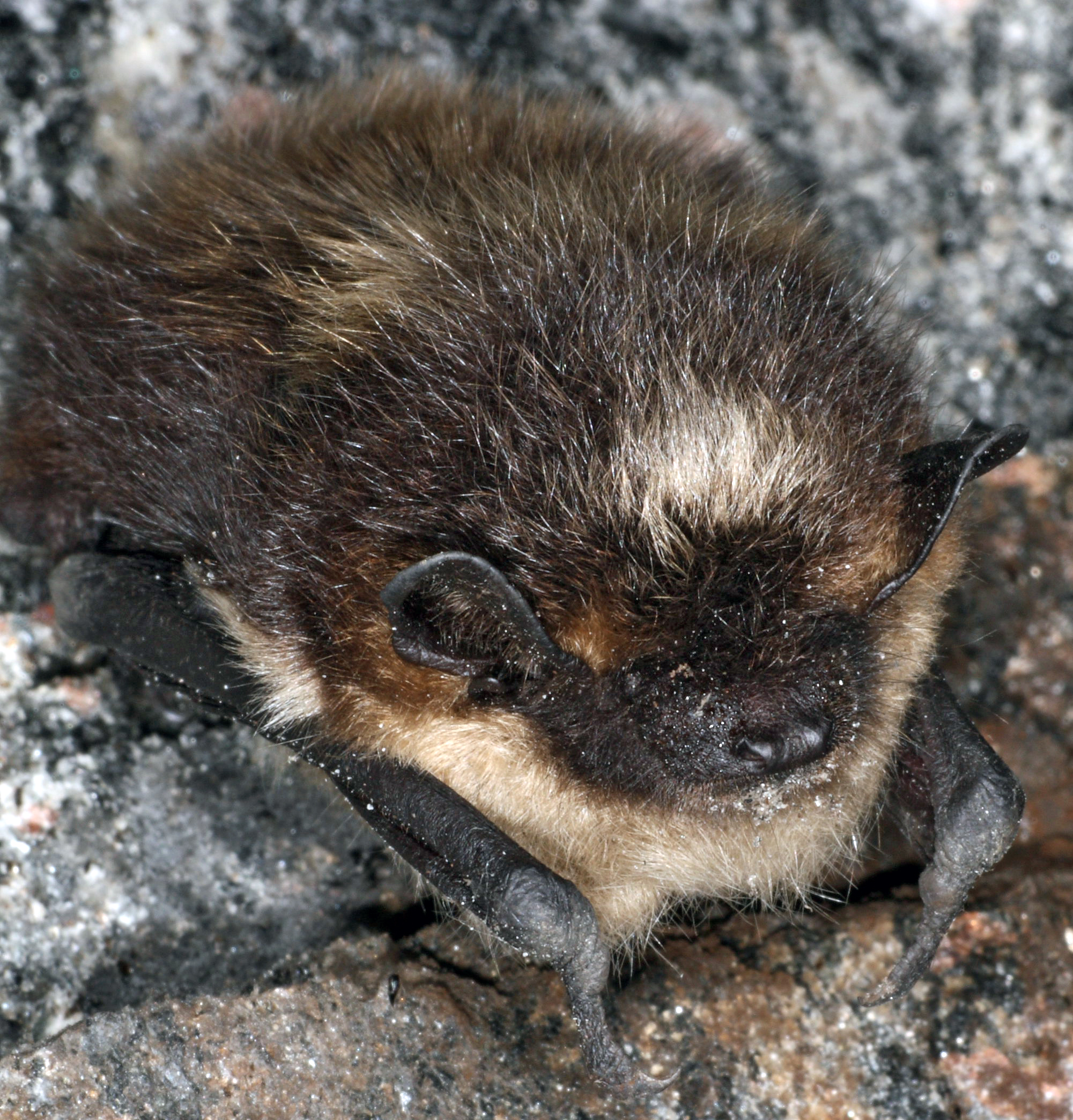
Northern bat hibernating deep in a disused cobalt mine in Norway

The northern bat is widespread throughout Eurasia, and is the most common bat in the northern part of the continent. It occurs from northern Scandinavia beyond the Arctic Circle to northern Italy, and eastern England to northern Japan. It favours forest uplands at elevations of 200–2,000 m (660–6,560 ft).

== Behaviour and ecology ==
Northern bat colonies have moved as far as 450 km (280 mi) over a period of several years. It breeds in late autumn, and the females stores the male sperm over the winter. Hibernation begins in November to December and lasts until April. Females become pregnant in spring and give birth 50–60 days later. In summer, males dwell alone. Females form a colony of 10–80 adults in early summer, which they disband in August, when young bats are able to fly. Winter colonies are often found in houses, and natural or artificial underground habitats.

=== Hunting ===
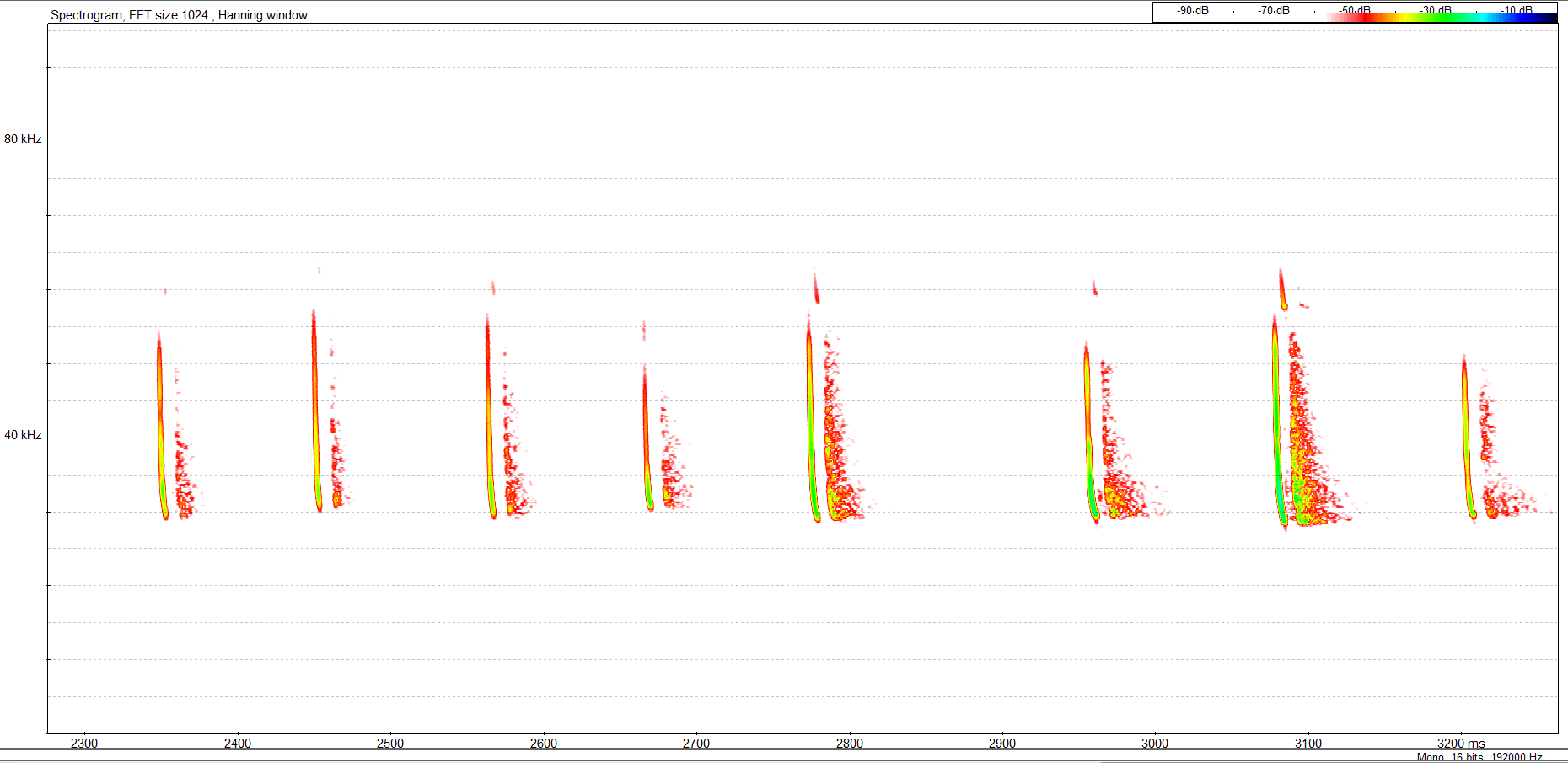
The echolocation call of Eptesicus nilssonii.

Northern bats are nocturnal and fast flying, adapted to hunting airborne insects using echolocation. For example, northern bats commonly hunt ghost moths while the moths are hovering above ground to attract a mate. The species hunts in open spaces at a speed of 5–6 m/s. The sound pulse consists of 10-13 ms in normal foraging habitats, sometimes up to 18 ms of steeply frequency-modulated (FM) component (about 40–30 kHz). The bats send out the pulse approximately once every 200 ms, and the steep FM are used to locate obstacles or targets, allowing them to fly indoors. In high latitude areas, female northern bats fly during daytime because of the short nights, but their foraging peaks after dusk and sometime before dawn. Females select small feeding territories where their food source is abundant, and sometimes can be used by the same individual over a period of years.

== Genetics ==
The northern bat is closely related to the serotine bat (Eptesicus serotinus). They are distinguishable by appearance but the genetic difference between the two species is an intraspecific variation.
