= Horn-skinned bat =

Conservation status
- Least Concern (IUCN 3.1)

Scientific classification
- Kingdom: Animalia
- Phylum: Chordata
- Class: Mammalia
- Order: Chiroptera
- Family: Vespertilionidae
- Genus: Eptesicus
- Species: E. floweri

Binomial name
- Eptesicus floweri de Winton, 1901
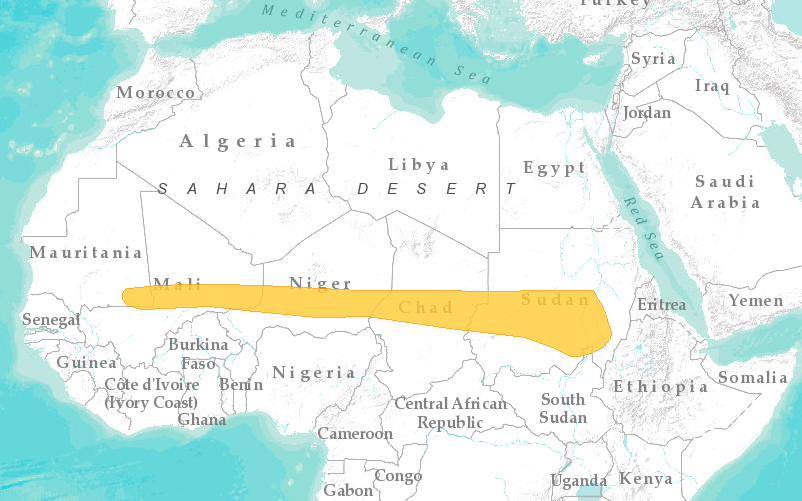

Species of bat

The horn-skinned bat (Eptesicus floweri) is a species of vesper bat. It can be found in Mali and Sudan in subtropical or tropical dry shrubland, subtropical or tropical dry lowland grassland, and hot deserts.
