= Ognev's serotine =

Conservation status
- Least Concern (IUCN 3.1)

Scientific classification
- Kingdom: Animalia
- Phylum: Chordata
- Class: Mammalia
- Order: Chiroptera
- Family: Vespertilionidae
- Genus: Eptesicus
- Species: E. ognevi

Binomial name
- Eptesicus ognevi Bobrinski, 1918

Synonyms
- Eptesicus bottae ognevi; Cnephaeus ognevi

Species of vesper bat

Ognev's serotine (Eptesicus ognevi) is a species of vesper bat found in western and central Asia.

== Taxonomy ==
Described in 1918 by Nikolay Alekseyevich Bobrinski, it was later synonymized with Botta's serotine (E. bottae) of Western Asia and Egypt. However, a 2013 genetic study found that while there were very subtle morphological differences between both taxa, mtDNA and nuclear DNA analyses supported both taxa being distinct from one another, and they were thus split as distinct species. The results of this study have been followed by the American Society of Mammalogists, the IUCN Red List, and the ITIS.

== Distribution and habitat ==
It is known from the Caucasus, Central Asia, and northern South Asia, ranging from Georgia east to Kazakhstan and south to Kashmir. It is known from northern Afghanistan, Armenia, Azerbaijan, Georgia, northernmost India, northeastern Iran, southern Kazakhstan, Kyrgyzstan, northernmost Pakistan, Tajikistan, Turkmenistan, and Uzbekistan. It inhabits arid and semiarid habitats including steppe and rocky mountains. It roosts in crevices, such as natural rock crevices, buildings, and ruins, including tombs.

== Status ==
This species has a wide range and no major threats, so it is considered Least Concern by the IUCN, although it is naturally uncommon in the eastern part of its range. It may be threatened by habitat degradation across parts of its range, and as it roosts in ruins, tourism-related development activities may negatively impact populations.
