= Sombre bat =

Conservation status
- Data Deficient (IUCN 3.1)

Scientific classification
- Kingdom: Animalia
- Phylum: Chordata
- Class: Mammalia
- Order: Chiroptera
- Family: Vespertilionidae
- Genus: Eptesicus
- Species: E. tatei

Binomial name
- Eptesicus tatei Ellerman & Morrison-Scott, 1951

Species of bat

The sombre bat (Eptesicus tatei) is a species of vesper bat. It is found only in India. Its natural habitat is subtropical and tropical moist montane forests.
