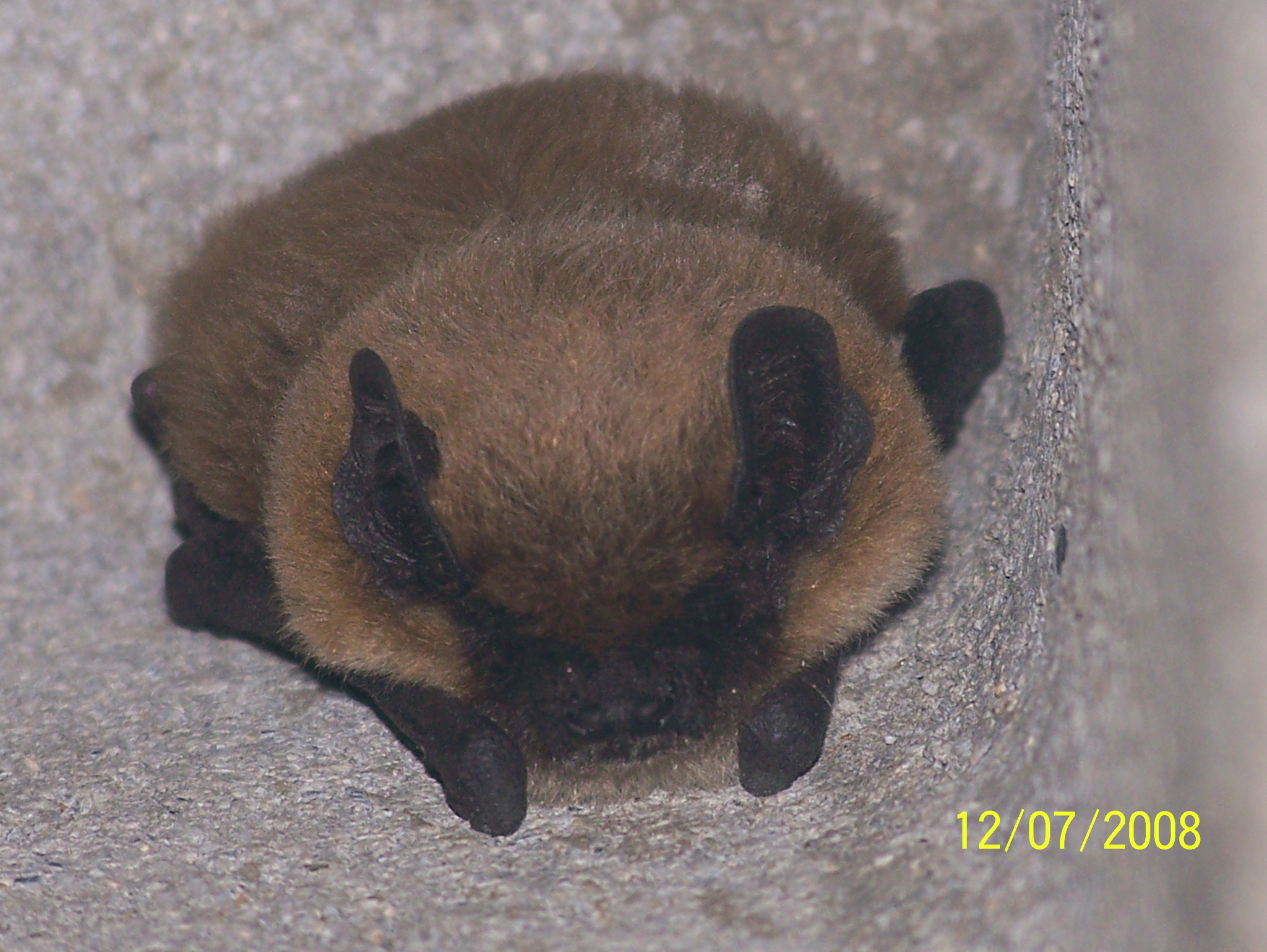

Conservation status
- Least Concern (IUCN 3.1)

Scientific classification
- Kingdom: Animalia
- Phylum: Chordata
- Class: Mammalia
- Order: Chiroptera
- Family: Vespertilionidae
- Genus: Eptesicus
- Species: E. isabellinus

Binomial name
- Eptesicus isabellinus Temminck, 1840
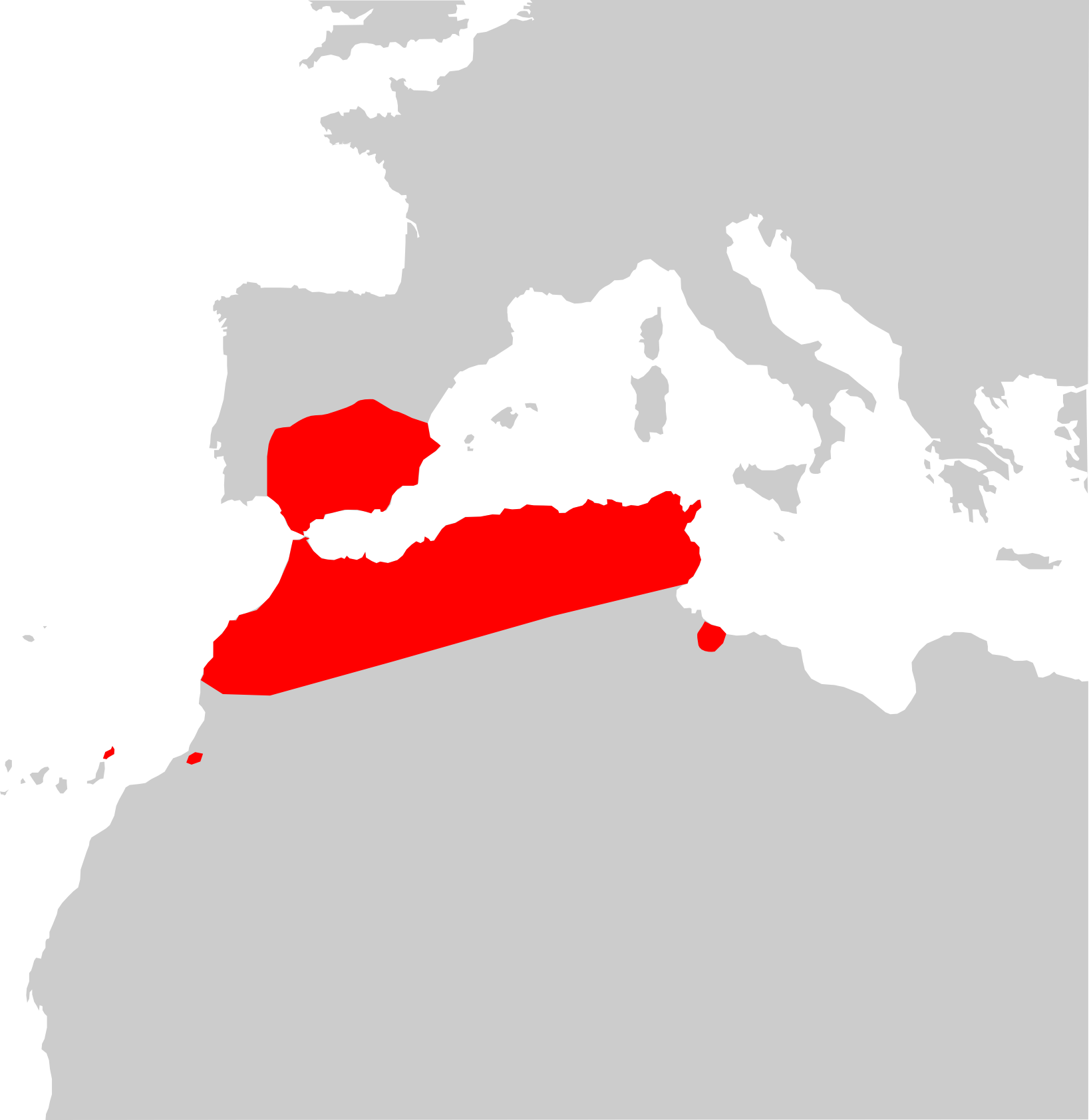
- Range of the meridional serotine

Synonyms
- Vespertilio isabellinus Temminck, 1840; Eptesicus serotinus isabellinus David Harrison, 1963

= Meridional serotine =

Species of bat

The meridional serotine (Eptesicus isabellinus) is a species of bat native to the Iberian Peninsula, Morocco, Algeria, Tunisia and Libya.

== Taxonomy and etymology ==
The taxonomic status of Eptesicus isabellinus has been revised several times since its initial description. This species was initially described in 1840 by Dutch zoologist Coenraad Jacob Temminck. He placed it in the genus Vespertilio, naming it Vespertilio isabellinus. In 1887, French zoologist Fernand Lataste intimated that he believed that the meridional serotine was a subspecies of the serotine bat, Eptesicus serotinus, per Harrison 1963. In 1963, David Harrison determined that morphologically, Eptesicus isabellinus was indistinguishable from Eptesicus serotinus, and suggested that its name should be Eptesicus serotinus isabellinus to recognize it as a subspecies of the latter.

In 2006, Ibáñez and others examined the mitochondrial DNA of several members of the European Eptesicus species, finding considerable genetic diversity. They concluded that Eptesicus serotinus was a species complex of morphologically similar but genetically distinct species. They recommended that Eptesicus serotinus isabellinus should be elevated to a species, suggesting a reversion to the name Eptesicus isabellinus if the population of southern Iberia represented the same species as the population of northern Africa (formerly Eptesicus serotinus boscai), which it did. In 2013, another study was published on the genetics of Eptesicus isabellinus, which further supported its elevation to species rank.

Its species name isabellinus is a Neo-Latin rendering of isabelline, which means pale yellow in color. In his initial description of the species, Temmick described its fur color as "a beautiful shade of isabella."

== Description ==
The forearm is 51 mm (2.0 in) long, and the hind foot is 11.6–11.8 mm (0.46–0.46 in) long. It has long, silky hair on its back, with individual hairs 8 mm (0.31 in) long. Hairs on its belly are shorter, at 6 mm (0.24 in) long. It can be distinguished from the closely related serotine bat by its yellowish brown fur, which is much lighter than that of the serotine bat. The internal margin of the ear is convex; ears are rounded at the tip. The tragus is blunt at the tip. The feet are large with brown claws and hairy toes.

== Biology ==
It is insectivorous, feeding on beetles, moths, and flies. Important prey items include scarab beetles and various flies. Females will form maternity colonies, consisting of 20-100 individuals.

== Habitat and range ==
It has been documented in Spain, Portugal, Gibraltar, Morocco, Algeria, Tunisia, and Libya. It has not been documented at elevations over 1,800 m (5,900 ft). During the day, it will roost in rock crevices, bridges, and buildings. It is tolerant of a wide range of climates and habitats, including semi-desert, temperate forest, shrubland, suburbs, and subtropical dry forest. It prefers to forage over open habitats such as pastures and gardens.

== Conservation ==
It is currently evaluated as least concern by the IUCN. In some areas of southern Spain, it is considered one of the most common species of bat.
