= Harmless serotine =

Conservation status
- Near Threatened (IUCN 3.1)

Scientific classification
- Kingdom: Animalia
- Phylum: Chordata
- Class: Mammalia
- Order: Chiroptera
- Family: Vespertilionidae
- Genus: Eptesicus
- Species: E. innoxius

Binomial name
- Eptesicus innoxius (Gervais, 1841)

Synonyms
- Eptesicus espadae Cabrera 1901

Species of bat

The harmless serotine (Eptesicus innoxius) is a species of vesper bat. It has a restricted range in western Ecuador and northwestern Peru. An insectivorous species, it is a resident of tropical dry forest habitat, and is threatened by deforestation.
