= Lagos serotine =

Conservation status
- Data Deficient (IUCN 3.1)

Scientific classification
- Kingdom: Animalia
- Phylum: Chordata
- Class: Mammalia
- Order: Chiroptera
- Family: Vespertilionidae
- Genus: Eptesicus
- Species: E. platyops

Binomial name
- Eptesicus platyops Thomas, 1901

Species of bat

The Lagos serotine (Eptesicus platyops) is a species of vesper bat. It is found in Equatorial Guinea, Nigeria, and possibly Senegal.
