= Long-tailed house bat =

Conservation status
- Least Concern (IUCN 3.1)

Scientific classification
- Kingdom: Animalia
- Phylum: Chordata
- Class: Mammalia
- Order: Chiroptera
- Family: Vespertilionidae
- Genus: Eptesicus
- Species: E. hottentotus

Binomial name
- Eptesicus hottentotus A. Smith, 1833

Species of bat

The long-tailed house bat or long-tailed serotine bat (Eptesicus hottentotus) is a species of vesper bat found in Kenya, Lesotho, Malawi, Mozambique, Namibia, South Africa, Zambia, and Zimbabwe. It is found in savanna, subtropical or tropical dry shrubland, Mediterranean-type shrubby vegetation, rocky areas, and caves.
