= Little black serotine =

Conservation status
- Least Concern (IUCN 3.1)

Scientific classification
- Kingdom: Animalia
- Phylum: Chordata
- Class: Mammalia
- Order: Chiroptera
- Family: Vespertilionidae
- Genus: Eptesicus
- Species: E. andinus

Binomial name
- Eptesicus andinus (J.A. Allen, 1914)

Species of bat

The little black serotine (Eptesicus andinus) is a species of insectivorous vesper bat. It is found in Colombia, Ecuador, Peru, Venezuela, Bolivia and Brazil at elevations from 100 to 3300 m.
