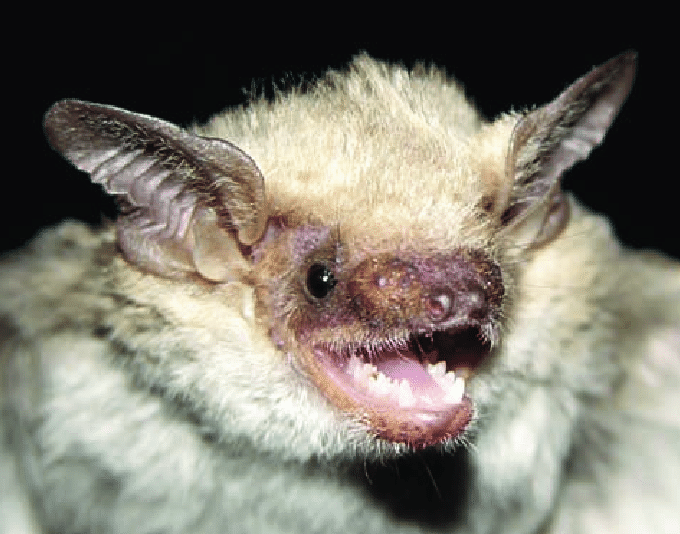

Conservation status
- Least Concern (IUCN 3.1)

Scientific classification
- Kingdom: Animalia
- Phylum: Chordata
- Class: Mammalia
- Order: Chiroptera
- Family: Vespertilionidae
- Genus: Eptesicus
- Species: E. bottae

Binomial name
- Eptesicus bottae (Peters, 1869)

Synonyms
- Vesperus bottae Peters, 1869; Vesperugo serotinus Schreber, 1775

= Botta's serotine =

Species of bat

Botta's serotine (Eptesicus bottae) is a species of vesper bat, one of 25 in the genus Eptesicus. It is found in rocky areas and temperate desert.

== Taxonomy and etymology ==
It was described as a new species in 1869 by German naturalist Wilhelm Peters. Peters placed it in the now-defunct bat genus Vesperus with a binomial of V. bottae. The holotype was collected in southwestern Yemen.by Paul-Émile Botta in 1837. Botta is the eponym for the species name "bottae". In 1878, George Edward Dobson wrote that he considered it synonymous with the serotine bat, Vesperugo (=Eptesicus) serotinus. By 1967, it was referred to as its present name combination, Eptesicus bottae.

From 1976 until 2006, the closely related species Eptesicus anatolicus was widely considered a part of E. bottae, despite E. anatolicus being separately identified in 1971. This conception was largely overturned by Benda and colleagues in 2006. Until 2013, Ognev's serotine (E. ognevi) was also considered a part of E. bottae, until genetic analyses confirmed both as distinct species.

== Description ==
Individuals weigh 8–9 g (0.28–0.32 oz) and have wingspans of 28.2 cm (11.1 in). It has a forearm length of 38–47 mm (1.5–1.9 in). It has an average flight speed of 5.7 m/s (13 mph).

== Range and habitat ==
It is found in several countries bordering the eastern part of the Mediterranean Sea and the Middle East. It can be found in Egypt, Iran, Iraq, Israel, Jordan, Oman, State of Palestine, Saudi Arabia, Syrian Arab Republic, the United Arab Emirates, Yemen, and possibly Lebanon. It has been documented at a range of elevations up to 2,100 m (6,900 ft) above sea level.

== Conservation ==
As of 2021, it is evaluated as a least-concern species by the IUCN. Within Egypt, it is considered locally common, though it is less common in other parts of its range.
