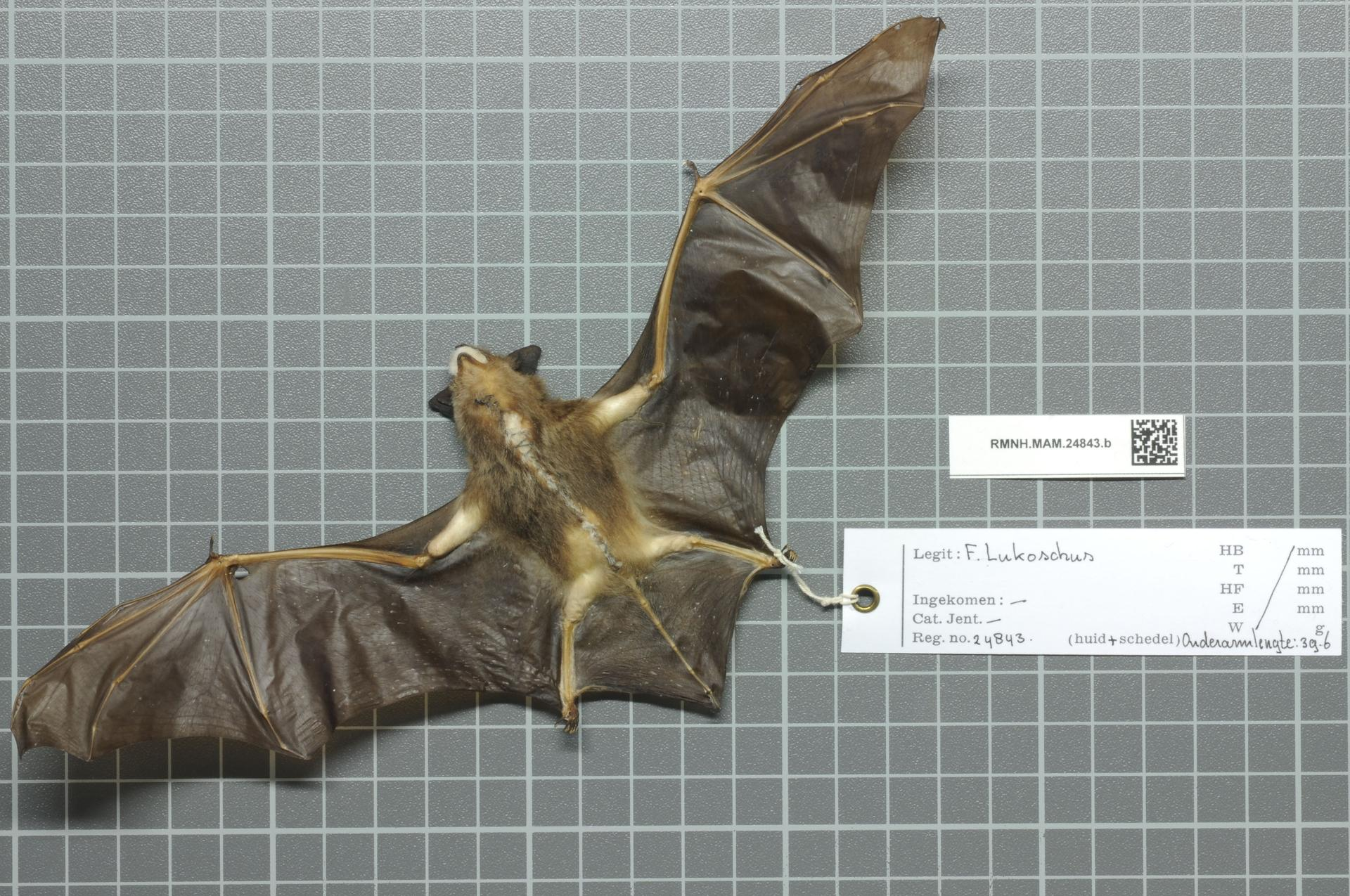
- A preserved Eptesicus brasiliensis specimen

Conservation status
- Least Concern (IUCN 3.1)

Scientific classification
- Kingdom: Animalia
- Phylum: Chordata
- Class: Mammalia
- Order: Chiroptera
- Family: Vespertilionidae
- Genus: Eptesicus
- Species: E. brasiliensis

Binomial name
- Eptesicus brasiliensis Desmarest, 1819

= Brazilian brown bat =

Species of bat

The Brazilian brown bat (Eptesicus brasiliensis) is a bat species from South and Central America.

== Description ==
The Brazilian brown bat is medium in size, being 85–91 mm (3.3–3.6 in) long, and has forearms that are 41–47 mm (1.6–1.9 in) long. It has a long tail and triangular ears.

== Habitat ==
The Brazilian brown bat is found in forests and forest edges, primarily near sources of water like streams and rivers. They roost in hollow trees and houses.
