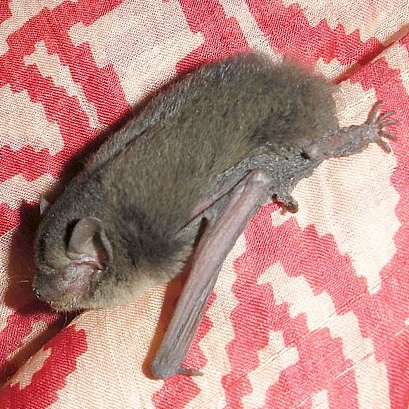
- Indian pipistrelle (Pipistrellus coromandra)

Scientific classification
- Kingdom: Animalia
- Phylum: Chordata
- Class: Mammalia
- Infraclass: Placentalia
- Order: Chiroptera
- Family: Vespertilionidae
- Subfamily: Vespertilioninae
- Tribe: Pipistrellini; Tate, 1942

Genera
- Glischropus; Nyctalus; Pipistrellus; Scotoecus; Scotozous; Vansonia

= Pipistrellini =

Tribe of vesper bats

Pipistrellini is a tribe of bats in the family Vespertilionidae. It contains several genera found throughout the Old World and Australasia, including the pipistrelles, noctules and related species.

== Species ==
Species in the tribe include:

- Genus Alionoctula - eastern pipistrelles
  - Japanese pipistrelle, Alionoctula abramus
  - Forest pipistrelle, Alionoctula adamsi
  - Angulate pipistrelle, Alionoctula angulata
  - Babu's pipistrelle, Alionoctula babu
  - Kelaart's pipistrelle, Alionoctula ceylonica
  - Greater Papuan pipistrelle, Alionoctula collina
  - Indian pipistrelle, Alionoctula coromandra
  - Dhofar pipistrelle, Alionoctula dhofarensis
  - Endo's pipistrelle, Alionoctula endoi
  - Java pipistrelle, Alionoctula javanica
  - Minahassa pipistrelle, Alionoctula minahassae
  - †Christmas Island pipistrelle, Alionoctula murrayi
  - Lesser Papuan pipistrelle, Alionoctula papuana
  - Mount Popa pipistrelle, Alionoctula paterculus
  - Narrow-winged pipistrelle, Alionoctula stenopterus
  - †Sturdee's pipistrelle, Alionoctula sturdeei
  - Least pipistrelle, Alionoctula tenuis
  - Watts's pipistrelle, Alionoctula wattsi
  - Northern pipistrelle, Alionoctula westralis
- Genus Glischropus – thick-thumbed bats
  - Dark thick-thumbed bat, Glischropus aquilus
  - Indochinese thick-thumbed bat, Glischropus bucephalus
  - Javan thick-thumbed bat, Glischropus javanus
  - Meghalaya Thick-thumbed Bat, Glischropus meghalayanus
  - Common thick-thumbed bat, Glischropus tylopus
- Genus Nyctalus – noctule bats
  - Birdlike noctule, Nyctalus aviator
  - Azores noctule, Nyctalus azoreum
  - Japanese noctule, Nyctalus furvus
  - Greater noctule bat, Nyctalus lasiopterus
  - Lesser noctule, Nyctalus leisleri
  - Mountain noctule, Nyctalus montanus
  - Common noctule, Nyctalus noctula
  - Chinese noctule, Nyctalus plancyi
- Genus Pipistrellus – western pipistrelles
  - Mount Gargues pipistrelle, Pipistrellus aero
  - Crete pipistrelle, Pipistrellus creticus
  - Bioko Pipistrelle, Pipistrellus etula
  - Hanaki's dwarf bat, Pipistrellus hanaki
  - Dusky pipistrelle, Pipistrellus hesperidus
  - Aellen's pipistrelle, Pipistrellus inexspectatus
  - Kuhl's pipistrelle, Pipistrellus kuhlii
  - Madeira pipistrelle, Pipistrellus maderensis
  - Tiny pipistrelle, Pipistrellus nanulus
  - Nathusius's pipistrelle, Pipistrellus nathusii
  - Dar es Salaam pipistrelle, Pipistrellus permixtus
  - Common pipistrelle, Pipistrellus pipistrellus
  - Soprano pipistrelle, Pipistrellus pygmaeus
  - Racey's Pipistrelle, Pipistrellus raceyi
  - Rusty pipistrelle, Pipistrellus rusticus
  - Simandou pipistrelle, Pipistrellus simandouensis
- Genus Scotoecus - house bats
  - White-bellied lesser house bat, Scotoecus albigula
  - Light-winged lesser house bat, Scotoecus albofuscus
  - Hinde's lesser house bat, Scotoecus hindei
  - Dark-winged lesser house bat, Scotoecus hirundo
  - Desert yellow bat, Scotoecus pallidus
- Genus Scotozous
  - Dormer's bat, Scotozous dormeri
- Genus Vansonia
  - Rüppell's bat, Vansonia rueppellii
