= List of mammals of Laos =

This is a list of the mammal species recorded in Laos.

== Order: Artiodactyla (even-toed ungulates and cetaceans) ==
Image	Common name	Scientific name authority	Preferred habitat	IUCN status	Range
Family Suidae: pigs
	Wild boar	Sus scrofa Linnaeus, 1758	Wide variety of habitats	LC^{IUCN} Unknown	
Family Tragulidae: mouse-deer
	Lesser mouse-deer	Tragulus kanchil Raffles, 1821	Lowland forests	LC^{IUCN} Unknown	
Family Moschidae: musk deer
	Dwarf musk deer	Moschus berezovskii Flerov, 1929	Montane forests	EN^{IUCN} ▼	
Family Cervidae: deer
	Eld's deer	Rucervus eldii McClelland, 1842	Grasslands	EN^{IUCN} ▼	
	Sambar deer	Rusa unicolor Kerr, 1792	Wide variety of forest and savanna	VU^{IUCN} ▼	
	Roosevelt's muntjac	Muntiacus rooseveltorum Osgood, 1932	Forest	DD^{IUCN} ▼	
	Truong Son muntjac	Muntiacus truongsonensis Giao, Tuoc, Dung, Wikramanayake, Amato, Arctander & Mackinnon, 1997	High-elevation forest	DD^{IUCN} ▼	
	Indian muntjac	Muntiacus vaginalis Zimmermann, 1780	Wide variety of forests and scrublands	LC^{IUCN} ▼	
	Giant muntjac	Muntiacus vuquangensis Tuoc, Dung, Dawson, Arctander and Mackinnon, 1994	Unclear	CR^{IUCN} ▼	
Family Bovidae: cattle, antelope, sheep, goats
	Gaur	Bos gaurus Smith, 1827	Forest, grassland, shrubland and savanna	VU^{IUCN} ▼	
	Banteng	Bos javanicus d'Alton, 1823	Forest and grassland	EN^{IUCN} ▼	
	Kouprey	Bos sauveli Urbain, 1937	Previously seen in dipterocarp forests with grasslands. No confirmations since 1970; possibly extinct.	CR, possibly EX ▼	
	Mainland serow	Capricornis sumatraensis Bechstein, 1799	Forested mountain slopes	VU^{IUCN} ▼	
	Chinese goral	Naemorhedus griseus A. Milne-Edwards, 1871			
	Saola	Pseudoryx nghetinhensis Dung, Giao, Chinh, Tuoc, Arctander, & MacKinnon, 1993	Evergreen forest	CR^{IUCN} ▼	
Family Delphinidae: marine dolphins
	Irrawaddy dolphin	Orcaella brevirostris Owen in Gray, 1866	Coastal waters and rivers	EN^{IUCN} ▼	

== Order: Carnivora (carnivorans) ==
Image	Common name	Scientific name (authority)	Preferred habitat	IUCN status	Range
Family Felidae: cats
	Asian golden cat	Catopuma temminckii Vigors & Horsfield, 1827	Forest, savanna, shrubland and grassland	NT^{IUCN} ▼	
	Jungle cat	Felis chaus Schreber, 1777	Particularly around wetlands	LC^{IUCN} ▼	
	Clouded leopard	Neofelis nebulosa Griffith, 1821	Forest and shrubland	VU^{IUCN} ▼	
	Leopard	Panthera pardus Linnaeus, 1758	Wide range of habitats	VU^{IUCN} ▼	
	Tiger	Panthera tigris Linnaeus, 1758	Generalists but especially forests	EN^{IUCN} ▼	
	Marbled cat	Pardofelis marmorata Martin, 1836	Forest	NT^{IUCN} ▼	
	Leopard cat	Prionailurus bengalensis Kerr, 1792	Forest, shrublands and grasslands	LC^{IUCN}	
Family Viverridae
	Binturong	Arctictis binturong Raffles, 1822	Forest (arboreal)	VU^{IUCN} ▼	
	Small-toothed palm civet	Arctogalidia trivirgata Gray, 1832	Evergreen and semi-evergreen forest	LC^{IUCN} ▼	
	Masked palm civet	Paguma larvata Smith, 1827	Mainly evergreen and semi-evergreen forest	LC^{IUCN} ▼	
	Asian palm civet	Paradoxurus hermaphroditus Pallas, 1777	Wide range of forest, plantation, and urban environments	LC^{IUCN} ▼	
	Large-spotted civet	Viverra megaspila Blyth, 1862	Lowland forest	EN^{IUCN} ▼	
	Large Indian civet	Viverra zibetha Linnaeus, 1758	Forests and shrublands	LC^{IUCN} ▼	
	Small Indian civet	Viverricula indica Geoffroy Saint-Hilaire, 1803	Wide range of forests and wetlands	LC^{IUCN}	
	Owston's palm civet	Chrotogale owstoni Thomas, 1912	Wide range of forests and wetlands	EN^{IUCN} ▼	
Family Prionodontidae: linsangs
	Spotted linsang	Prionodon pardicolor Hodgson, 1842	Forest, shrubland, and grassland	LC^{IUCN} ▼	
Family Herpestidae: mongooses
	Crab-eating Mongoose	Urva urva Hodgson, 1836	Widespread	LC^{IUCN} ▼	
	Javan mongoose	Urva javanica É. Geoffroy Saint-Hilaire, 1818	Widespread in lowlands, including anthropogenic habitats	LC^{IUCN} Unknown	
Family Canidae: dogs, foxes
	Dhole	Cuon alpinus Pallas, 1811	Forest, shrubland and grassland	EN^{IUCN} ▼	
	Golden jackal	Canis aureus Linnaeus, 1758	Wide variety, especially lowland deciduous dipterocarp forest	LC^{IUCN} ▲	
Family Ursidae: bears
	Sun bear	Helarctos malayanus Raffles, 1821	Forest and shrubland	VU^{IUCN} ▼	
	Asian black bear	Ursus thibetanus G. Cuvier, 1823	Forest and shrubland	VU^{IUCN} ▼	
Family Mustelidae: mustelids
	Yellow-throated marten	Martes flavigula Boddaert, 1785	Forests and shrublands	LC^{IUCN} ▼	
	Yellow-bellied weasel	Mustela kathiah Hodgson, 1835	Rugged highlands	LC^{IUCN}	
	Siberian weasel	Mustela sibirica Pallas, 1773	Rocky areas in far north	LC^{IUCN}	
	Back-striped weasel	Mustela strigidorsa Gray, 1853	Mountainous evergreen forest	LC^{IUCN}	
	Greater hog badger	Arctonyx collaris Cuvier, 1825	Mainly forest	VU^{IUCN} ▼	
	Burmese ferret-badger	Melogale personata I. Geoffroy Saint-Hilaire, 1831	Forests, shrublands and grasslands	LC^{IUCN} Unknown	
	Eurasian otter	Lutra lutra Linnaeus, 1758	Wide range of aquatic habitats	NT^{IUCN} ▼	
	Hairy-nosed otter	Lutra sumatrana Gray, 1865	Wide range of aquatic habitats	EN^{IUCN} ▼	
	Smooth-coated otter	Lutrogale perspicillata Geoffroy Saint Hilaire, 1826	Wide range of aquatic habitats, including flooded ricefields	VU^{IUCN} ▼	
	Asian small-clawed otter	Aonyx cinereus Illiger, 1815	Wetland systems	VU^{IUCN} ▼	
	Chinese ferret-badger	Melogale moschata Gray, 1831	Forest and croplands	LC^{IUCN}	

== Order: Chiroptera (bats) ==
Image	Common name	Scientific name (authority)	Preferred habitat	IUCN status	Range
Family Pteropodidae: flying foxes, Old World fruit bats
	Lesser short-nosed fruit bat	Cynopterus brachyotis Müller, 1838	Forest	LC^{IUCN} Unknown	
	Greater short-nosed fruit bat	Cynopterus sphinx Vahl, 1797	Forest	LC^{IUCN} ▲	
	Cave nectar bat	Eonycteris spelaea Dobson, 1871	Caves and forest	LC^{IUCN} ▼	
	Long-tongued fruit bat	Macroglossus sobrinus K. Andersen, 1911	Forest	LC^{IUCN}	
	Ratanaworabhan's fruit bat	Megaerops niphanae Yenbutra & Felten, 1983	Forest	LC^{IUCN}	
	Geoffroy's rousette	Rousettus amplexicaudatus É. Geoffroy, 1810	Caves, rocky areas and forests	LC^{IUCN} Unknown	
	Leschenault's rousette	Rousettus leschenaultii Desmarest, 1820	Caves and forests	NT^{IUCN} ▼	
	Blanford's fruit bat	Sphaerias blanfordi Thomas, 1891	Bamboo forest	LC^{IUCN}	
Family Vespertilionidae
	Eastern barbastelle	Barbastella darjelingensis Hodgson, 1855	Caves and forest	LC^{IUCN}	
	Oriental serotine	Eptesicus pachyomus Tomes, 1857	Wide variety of habitats	LC^{IUCN} Unknown	
	Serotine bat	Eptesicus serotinus Schreber, 1774	Wide variety of habitats	LC^{IUCN}	
	Disk-footed bat	Eudiscopus denticulus Conisbee, 1953	Forest	LC^{IUCN} Unknown	
	Indochinese thick-thumbed bat	Glischropus bucephalus Csorba, 2011	Bamboo forest	LC^{IUCN} Unknown	
	Lesser hairy-winged bat	Harpiocephalus harpia Temminck C. J., 1840	Forest	LC^{IUCN} ▼	
	Blanford's bat	Hesperoptenus blanfordi Dobson, 1877	Caves and forests	LC^{IUCN} Unknown	
	Tickell's bat	Hesperoptenus tickelli Blyth, 1851	Caves and forests	LC^{IUCN} Unknown	
	Cadorna's pipistrelle	Hypsugo cadornae Thomas, 1916	Forest	LC^{IUCN} Unknown	
	Long-toothed pipistrelle	Hypsugo dolichodon Görföl et al., 2014	Caves and forests	DD^{IUCN} Unknown	
	Chinese pipistrelle	Hypsugo pulveratus Peters, 1870	Limestone forest	LC^{IUCN} Unknown	
	Great evening bat	Ia io Thomas, 1902	Forest	NT^{IUCN} ▼	
	Flat-skulled woolly bat	Kerivoula depressa	Evergreen forest	LC^{IUCN} Unknown	
	Indochinese woolly bat	Kerivoula dongduongana	Caves and forest	LC^{IUCN} Unknown	
	Dark woolly bat	Kerivoula furva	Forest	LC^{IUCN} Unknown	
	Hairy-faced bat	Kerivoula hardwickii Dobson, 1871	Evergreen forest	LC^{IUCN} Unknown	
	Kachin woolly bat	Kerivoula kachinensis Bates, Struebig, Rossiter, Kingston, Sia Sein Lein Oo & Khin Mya Mya, 2004	Forest	LC^{IUCN}	
	Papillose woolly bat	Kerivoula papillosa Temminck, 1840	Forest	LC^{IUCN}	
	Painted bat	Kerivoula picta Pallas, 1767	Wide variety of habitats	NT^{IUCN} ▼	
	Titania's woolly bat	Kerivoula titania Bates, Struebig, Hayes, Furey, Mya Mya, Thong, Tien, Son, Harrison, Francis & Csorba, 2007	Forest	LC^{IUCN} Unknown	
	Annam tube-nosed bat	Murina annamitica	Forest	LC^{IUCN} Unknown	
	Round-eared tube-nosed bat	Murina cyclotis Dobson, 1871	Caves and forests	LC^{IUCN} Unknown	
	Elery's tube-nosed bat	Murina eleryi Furey, Thong, Bates & Csorba, 2009	Forest	LC^{IUCN} ▼	
	Fea's tube-nosed bat	Murina feae	Forest	LC^{IUCN} Unknown	
	Fiona's Tube-nosed Bat	Murina fionae	Forest	LC^{IUCN} Unknown	
	Harrison's tube-nosed bat	Murina harrisoni Csorba & Bates 2005	Forest	LC^{IUCN} Unknown	
	Hutton's tube-nosed bat	Murina huttoni Peters, 1872	Forest	LC^{IUCN} Unknown	
	Walston's tube-nosed bat	Murina walstoni Furey, Csorba & Son, 2011	Forest	DD^{IUCN} Unknown	
	Annam tube-nosed bat	Myotis annamitica Kruskop & Tsytsulina, 2001	Small river valleys	DD^{IUCN} Unknown	
	Anna Tess's myotis	Myotis annatessae Kruskop & Borisenko, 2013	Forest	DD^{IUCN} Unknown	
	Hairy-faced bat	Myotis annectans Dobson, 1871	Evergreen forest	LC^{IUCN} Unknown	
	Large myotis	Myotis chinensis Tomes, 1857	Caves and forest	LC^{IUCN} Unknown	
	Lesser large-footed bat	Myotis hasseltii Temminck, 1840	Caves and forests	LC^{IUCN} Unknown	
	Horsfield's bat	Myotis horsfieldii Temminck, 1840	Caves and forest	LC^{IUCN}	
	Indochinese mouse-eared bat	Myotis indochinensis Son, 2013	Forest	DD^{IUCN} Unknown	
	Burmese whiskered myotis	Myotis montivagus Dobson, 1874	Caves and forest	DD^{IUCN}	
	Wall-roosting mouse-eared bat	Myotis muricola Gray, 1846	Caves and forests	LC^{IUCN}	
	Rickett's big-footed bat	Myotis pilosus Peters, 1869	Forests and wetlands	VU^{IUCN} ▼	
	Thick-thumbed myotis	Myotis rosseti Oey, 1951	Forest	LC^{IUCN} Unknown	
	Reddish-black myotis	Myotis rufoniger Tomes, 1858	Forest	LC^{IUCN} Unknown	
	Himalayan whiskered bat	Myotis siligorensis Horsfield, 1855	Caves and forests	LC^{IUCN} Unknown	
	Peters's trumpet-eared bat	Phoniscus jagorii Peters, 1866	Forest and wetlands	LC^{IUCN} Unknown	
	Japanese house bat	Pipistrellus abramus Temminck, 1840	Wide range of habitats	LC^{IUCN}	
	Kelaart's pipistrelle	Pipistrellus ceylonicus Kelaart, 1852	Caves and forest	LC^{IUCN}	
	Indian pipistrelle	Pipistrellus coromandra Gray, 1838	Caves and forests	LC^{IUCN} Unknown	
	Java pipistrelle	Pipistrellus javanicus Gray, 1838	Caves and forest	LC^{IUCN}	
	Mount Popa pipistrelle	Pipistrellus paterculus Thomas, 1915	Caves and forest	LC^{IUCN} Unknown	
	Least pipistrelle	Pipistrellus tenuis Temminck C. J., 1840	Forest, shrubland and grassland	LC^{IUCN}	
	Harlequin bat	Scotomanes ornatus Blyth, 1851	Caves and forests	LC^{IUCN} Unknown	
	Greater Asiatic yellow bat	Scotophilus heathii Horsfield, 1831	Forest and shrublands	LC^{IUCN}	
	Lesser Asiatic yellow bat	Scotophilus kuhlii Leach, 1821	Forest and shrublands	LC^{IUCN}	
	Collared sprite	Thainycteris aureocollaris Kock & Storch, 1996	Montane evergreen forest	LC^{IUCN} Unknown	
	Greater bamboo bat	Tylonycteris robustula Thomas, 1915	Caves and forests	LC^{IUCN} Unknown	
Family Miniopteridae
	Western bent-winged bat	Miniopterus magnater Sanborn, 1931	Caves and forest	LC^{IUCN} Unknown	
	Small bent-winged bat	Miniopterus pusillus Dobson, 1876	Caves and forest	LC^{IUCN} Unknown	
Family Molossidae: free-tailed bats
	Wrinkle-lipped free-tailed bat	Chaerephon plicatus Buchanan, 1800	Caves, rocky areas, savanna and forests	LC^{IUCN} Unknown	
	La Touche's free-tailed bat	Tadarida latouchei Thomas, 1920	Caves and forest	EN^{IUCN} ▼	
Family Emballonuridae
	Long-winged tomb bat	Taphozous longimanus Hardwicke, 1825	Caves, rocky areas, savanna and forests	LC^{IUCN}	
	Black-bearded tomb bat	Taphozous melanopogon Temminck, 1841	Caves, rocky areas, shrubland and forests	LC^{IUCN}	
Family Megadermatidae: false vampire bats
	Greater false vampire bat	Lyroderma lyra E. Geoffroy, 1810	Caves, rocky areas and forests	LC^{IUCN} Unknown	
	Lesser false vampire bat	Megaderma spasma Linnaeus, 1758	Caves, rocky areas and forests	LC^{IUCN} Unknown	
Family Rhinolophidae: horseshoe bats
	Acuminate horseshoe bat	Rhinolophus acuminatus Peters, 1871	Caves and forests	LC^{IUCN} Unknown	
	Intermediate horseshoe bat	Rhinolophus affinis Horsfield, 1823	Caves and forests	LC^{IUCN}	
	Bornean horseshoe bat	Rhinolophus borneensis Peters, 1861	Caves, rocky areas and forests	LC^{IUCN} Unknown	
	Croslet horseshoe bat	Rhinolophus coelophyllus Peters, 1867	Caves and forests	LC^{IUCN}	
	Convex horseshoe bat	Rhinolophus convexus Csorba, 1997	Caves and forests	DD^{IUCN} Unknown	
	Great woolly horseshoe bat	Rhinolophus luctus Temminck, 1835	Caves, rocky areas and forests	LC^{IUCN} Unknown	
	Big-eared horseshoe bat	Rhinolophus macrotis Blyth, 1844	Caves and forest	LC^{IUCN}	
	Malayan horseshoe bat	Rhinolophus malayanus Bonhote, 1903	Caves and forests	LC^{IUCN}	
	Marshall's horseshoe bat	Rhinolophus marshalli Thonglongya, 1973	Caves and forests	LC^{IUCN}	
	Indo-Chinese lesser brown horseshoe bat	Rhinolophus microglobosus Csorba and Jenkins, 1998	Caves and forests	LC^{IUCN}	
	Bourret's horseshoe bat	Rhinolophus paradoxolophus Bourret, 1951	Caves and forests	LC^{IUCN}	
	Pearson's horseshoe bat	Rhinolophus pearsonii Horsfield, 1851	Caves and forests	LC^{IUCN} Unknown	
	Least horseshoe bat	Rhinolophus pusillus Temminck, 1834	Caves and forests	LC^{IUCN}	
	Shamel's horseshoe bat	Rhinolophus shameli Tate, 1943	Caves and forests	LC^{IUCN}	
	Thai horseshoe bat	Rhinolophus siamensis Gyldenstolpe, 1917	Caves and evergreen forests	LC^{IUCN} Unknown	
	Thomas's horseshoe bat	Rhinolophus thomasi K. Andersen, 1905	Caves and forests	LC^{IUCN} Unknown	
Family Hipposideridae: Old World leaf-nosed bats
	Stoliczka's trident bat	Aselliscus stoliczkanus Dobson, 1871	Caves and forest	LC^{IUCN} Unknown	
	East Asian tailless leaf-nosed bat	Coelops frithii Blyth, 1848	Caves and forest	NT^{IUCN} ▼	
	Great roundleaf bat	Hipposideros armiger Hodgson, 1835	Caves and forest	LC^{IUCN} Unknown	
	Ashy roundleaf bat	Hipposideros cineraceus Blyth, 1853	Caves and forest	LC^{IUCN} Unknown	
	Diadem leaf-nosed bat	Hipposideros diadema É. Geoffroy, 1813	Caves, savanna and forests	LC^{IUCN} ▼	
	Cantor's roundleaf bat	Hipposideros galeritus Cantor, 1846	Caves and forests	LC^{IUCN} Unknown	
	Grand roundleaf bat	Hipposideros grandis G.M. Allen, 1936	Unknown	LC^{IUCN} Unknown	
	Phou Khao Khouay leaf-nosed bat	Hipposideros khaokhouayensis Guillén-Servent & Francis, 2006	Evergreen forest	VU^{IUCN} ▼	
	Intermediate roundleaf bat	Hipposideros larvatus Horsfield, 1823	Caves and forests	LC^{IUCN} Unknown	
	Shield-faced roundleaf bat	Hipposideros lylei Thomas, 1913	Caves and forest	LC^{IUCN} ▼	
	Laotian roundleaf bat	Hipposideros rotalis Francis, Kock & Habersetzer, 1999	Dry forest	LC^{IUCN} Unknown	
	Shield-nosed leaf-nosed bat	Hipposideros scutinares Robinson, Jenkins, Francis & Fulford, 2003	Caves and forest	VU^{IUCN} ▼	

== Order: Eulipotyphla (hedgehogs, shrews, moles and relatives) ==
Image	Common name	Scientific name (authority)	Preferred habitat	IUCN status	Range
Family Erinaceidae: hedgehogs
	Northern short-tailed gymnure	Hylomys peguensis Blyth, 1859	Forest and shrubland		
	Long-eared gymnure	Otohylomys megalotis Jenkins & M. F. Robinson, 2002	Karst landscapes	DD^{IUCN} Unknown	
Family Soricidae: shrews
	Southeast Asian shrew	Crocidura fuliginosa Blyth, 1856	Forest, shrublands, grasslands and rocky areas	LC^{IUCN}	
	Himalayan water shrew	Chimarrogale himalayica Gray, 1842	Evergreen forests	LC^{IUCN} Unknown	
	Etruscan shrew	Suncus etruscus Savi, 1822	Wide range of habitat	LC^{IUCN} Unknown	
	Taiwanese gray shrew	Crocidura tanakae Kuroda, 1938	Forest and grassland	LC^{IUCN} Unknown	
	Asian gray shrew	Crocidura attenuata Milne-Edwards, 1872	Forest, shrubland and grassland	LC^{IUCN} Unknown	
	Indochinese shrew	Crocidura indochinensis (Robinson and Kloss, 1922	Forest	LC^{IUCN} Unknown	
	Asian house shrew	Suncus murinus Linnaeus, 1766	Widespread	LC^{IUCN}	
	Hill's shrew	Crocidura hilliana Jenkins & Smith, 1995	Wide range of lowland habitat	DD^{IUCN} Unknown	
	Voracious shrew	Crocidura vorax Allen, 1923	Wide variety of habitats	LC^{IUCN} Unknown	
	Chinese mole shrew	Anourosorex squamipes Milne-Edwards, 1872	Montane forest	LC^{IUCN} Unknown	
Family Talpidae: moles
	Kloss's mole	Euroscaptor klossi Thomas, 1929	Forest	LC^{IUCN} Unknown	
	Long-tailed mole	Scaptonyx fusicauda Milne-Edwards, 1872	Montane forest	LC^{IUCN} Unknown	

== Order: Lagomorpha (lagomorphs) ==
Image	Common name	Scientific name (authority)	Preferred habitat	IUCN status	Range
Family Leporidae: rabbits, hares
	Burmese hare	Lepus peguensis Blyth, 1855	Grasslands, shrublands, savanna and forest	LC^{IUCN}	
	Annamite striped rabbit	Nesolagus timminsi Averianov, Abramov, & Tikhonov, 2000	Evergreen forest	EN^{IUCN} ▼	

== Order: Pholidota (pangolins) ==
Image	Common name	Scientific name (authority)	Preferred habitat	IUCN status	Range
Family Manidae
	Sunda pangolin	Manis javanica Desmarest, 1822	Forest and shrubland	CR^{IUCN} ▼	
	Chinese pangolin	Manis pentadactyla Linnaeus, 1758	Forest, grassland and shrubland	CR^{IUCN} ▼	

== Order: Primates ==
Image	Common name	Scientific name (authority)	Preferred habitat	IUCN status	Range
Family Lorisidae: lorises, bushbabies
	Bengal slow loris	Nycticebus bengalensis Lacépède, 1800	Forest	EN^{IUCN} ▼	
	Pygmy slow loris	Xanthonycticebus pygmaeus Bonhote, 1907	Forest	EN^{IUCN} ▼	
Family Cercopithecidae: Old World monkeys
	Stump-tailed macaque	Macaca arctoides I. Geoffroy, 1831	Forest	VU^{IUCN} ▼	
	Crab-eating macaque	Macaca fascicularis Raffles, 1821	Forest, wetlands and intertidal marine zone	EN^{IUCN} ▼	
	Northern pig-tailed macaque	Macaca leonina Blyth, 1863	Forest	VU^{IUCN} ▼	
	Assam macaque	Macaca assamensis McClelland, 1840	Forest	NT^{IUCN} ▼	
	Rhesus macaque	Macaca mulatta Zimmermann, 1780	Widespread, including around humans	LC^{IUCN} Unknown	
	Indochinese grey langur	Trachypithecus crepusculus Elliot, 1909	Forest and limestone karst	EN^{IUCN} ▼	
	Germain's langur	Trachypithecus germaini Milne-Edwards, 1876	Forest and rocky areas	EN^{IUCN} ▼	
	Laotian langur	Trachypithecus laotum Thomas, 1911	Forest and rocky areas	EN^{IUCN} ▼	
	Red-shanked douc	Pygathrix nemaeus Linnaeus, 1771	Forest	CR^{IUCN} ▼	
	Hatinh langur	Trachypithecus hatinhensis Dao, 1970	Limestone forest	EN^{IUCN} ▼	
Family Hylobatidae: gibbons
	Lar gibbon	Hylobates lar Linnaeus, 1771	Evergreen and semi-evergreen forest	EN^{IUCN} ▼	
	Pileated gibbon	Hylobates pileatus Gray, 1861	Forest	EN^{IUCN} ▼	
	Northern buffed-cheeked gibbon	Nomascus annamensis Thinh et al., 2010	Forest	EN^{IUCN} ▼	
	Black crested gibbon	Nomascus concolor Harlan, 1826	Forest	CR^{IUCN} ▼	
	Yellow-cheeked gibbon	Nomascus gabriellae Thomas, 1909	Forest	EN^{IUCN} ▼	
	Northern white-cheeked gibbon	Nomascus leucogenys Ogilby, 1840	Evergreen and semi-evergreen forest	CR^{IUCN} ▼	
	Southern white-cheeked gibbon	Nomascus siki Delacour, 1951	Evergreen forest	CR^{IUCN} ▼	

== Order: Proboscidea (elephants) ==
Image	Common name	Scientific name (authority)	Preferred habitat	IUCN status	Range
Family Elephantidae: elephants
	Asian elephant	Elephas maximus Linnaeus, 1758	Forest, shrubland, grassland	EN^{IUCN} ▼	

== Order: Rodentia (rodents) ==
Image	Common name	Scientific name (authority)	Preferred habitat	IUCN status	Range
Family Hystricidae: Old World porcupines
	Asiatic brush-tailed porcupine	Atherurus macrourus Linnaeus, 1758	Montane forest	LC^{IUCN} ▼	
	Malayan porcupine	Hystrix brachyura Linnaeus, 1758	Forest, shrubland and grassland	LC^{IUCN} ▼	
Family Sciuridae: squirrels
	Hairy-footed flying squirrel	Belomys pearsonii Gray, 1842	Dry deciduous forest	DD^{IUCN} Unknown	
	Laotian giant flying squirrel	Biswamoyopterus laoensis Sanamxay, Douangboubpha, Bumrungsri, Xayavong, Xayaphet, Satasook & Bates 2013	Forest; known from a single specimen	DD^{IUCN} Unknown	
	Grey-bellied squirrel	Callosciurus caniceps Gray, 1842	Forest and plantations	LC^{IUCN}	
	Pallas's squirrel	Callosciurus erythraeus Pallas, 1779	Montane forest and scrubland	LC^{IUCN}	
	Finlayson's squirrel	Callosciurus finlaysonii Horsfield, 1823	Forest, shrubland and inland wetlands	LC^{IUCN}	
	Asian red-cheeked squirrel	Dremomys rufigenis Blanford, 1878	Forest and shrubland	LC^{IUCN}	
	Particolored flying squirrel	Hylopetes alboniger Hodgson, 1836	Forest and shrubland	LC^{IUCN} ▼	
	Indochinese flying squirrel	Hylopetes phayrei Blyth, 1859	Lower montane and mixed deciduous forests	LC^{IUCN}	
	Red-cheeked flying squirrel	Hylopetes spadiceus Blyth, 1859	Forest and scrubland	LC^{IUCN} Unknown	
	Berdmore's ground squirrel	Menetes berdmorei Blyth, 1849	Forest, shrubland and grassland	LC^{IUCN}	
	Spotted giant flying squirrel	Petaurista elegans Müller, 1840	Montane forest	LC^{IUCN}	
	Red giant flying squirrel	Petaurista petaurista Pallas, 1766	Forest	LC^{IUCN} ▼	
	Indian giant flying squirrel	Petaurista philippensis Elliot, 1839	Forest	LC^{IUCN} ▼	
	Black giant squirrel	Ratufa bicolor Sparrman, 1778	Forest	NT^{IUCN} ▼	
	Maritime striped squirrel	Tamiops maritimus Bonhote, 1900	Forest	LC^{IUCN}	
	Himalayan striped squirrel	Tamiops mcclellandii Horsfield, 1840	Forest, shrubland, grassland and inland wetlands	LC^{IUCN}	
	Cambodian striped squirrel	Tamiops rodolphii Milne-Edwards, 1867	Forest and shrubland	LC^{IUCN}	
	Swinhoe's striped squirrel	Tamiops swinhoei Milne-Edwards, 1874	Wide variety of habitats	LC^{IUCN}	
Family Spalacidae
	Lesser bamboo rat	Cannomys badius Hodgson, 1841	Forest	LC^{IUCN} Unknown	
	Hoary bamboo rat	Rhizomys pruinosus Blyth, 1851	Forest and grassland	LC^{IUCN}	
	Chinese bamboo rat	Rhizomys sinensis J. E. Gray, 1831	Montane forest	LC^{IUCN} Unknown	
	Large bamboo rat	Rhizomys sumatrensis Raffles, 1821	Forest	LC^{IUCN} Unknown	
Family Diatomyidae
	Laotian rock rat	Laonastes aenigmamus Jenkins, Kilpatrick, Robinson & Timmins, 2005	Limestone forest	LC^{IUCN} ▼	
Family Muridae: mice, rats, gerbils
	Greater bandicoot rat	Bandicota indica Bechstein, 1800	Primarily cropland and cities	LC^{IUCN} ▲	
	Savile's bandicoot rat	Bandicota savilei Thomas, 1916	Primarily cropland	LC^{IUCN}	
	Small white-toothed rat	Berylmys berdmorei Blyth, 1851	Forest	LC^{IUCN}	
	Bower's white-toothed rat	Berylmys bowersi Anderson, 1879	Wide variety of habitats	LC^{IUCN} ▼	
	Fea's tree rat	Chiromyscus chiropus Thomas, 1891	Deciduous and evergreen forest	LC^{IUCN}	
	Indomalayan pencil-tailed tree mouse	Chiropodomys gliroides Blyth, 1856	Forest	LC^{IUCN}	
	Millard's rat	Dacnomys millardi Thomas, 1916	Forest	DD^{IUCN} Unknown	
	Delacour's marmoset rat	Hapalomys delacouri Thomas, 1927	Forest	NT^{IUCN} ▼	
	Edwards's long-tailed giant rat	Leopoldamys edwardsi Thomas, 1882	Forest	LC^{IUCN} Unknown	
	Neill's long-tailed giant rat	Leopoldamys neilli Marshall, 1976	Forest	LC^{IUCN} Unknown	
	Long-tailed giant rat	Leopoldamys sabanus Thomas, 1887	Forest	LC^{IUCN}	
	Mo's spiny rat	Maxomys moi Robinson & Kloss, 1922	Forest and shrubland	LC^{IUCN} ▼	
	Red spiny rat	Maxomys surifer Miller, 1900	Forest	LC^{IUCN} ▼	
	Ryukyu mouse	Mus caroli Bonhote, 1902	Shrubland and grassland	LC^{IUCN}	
	Fawn-colored mouse	Mus cervicolor Hodgson, 1845	Forest, shrubland and grassland	LC^{IUCN}	
	Cook's mouse	Mus cookii Ryley, 1914	Wide variety of habitat	LC^{IUCN}	
	Sheath-tailed mouse	Mus fragilicauda Auffray et al. 2003	Grassland; only known from two locations	LC^{IUCN} Unknown	
	House mouse	Mus musculus Linnaeus, 1758	Introduced; commensal with humans	LC^{IUCN}	
	Gairdner's shrewmouse	Mus pahari Thomas, 1916	Forest	LC^{IUCN}	
	Shortridge's mouse	Mus shortridgei Thomas, 1914	Grassland and shrubland	LC^{IUCN}	
	Chinese white-bellied rat	Niviventer confucianus Milne-Edwards, 1871	Forest and croplands	LC^{IUCN}	
	Chestnut white-bellied rat	Niviventer fulvescens Gray, 1847	Forest	LC^{IUCN} ▼	
	Lang Bian white-bellied rat	Niviventer langbianis Robinson & Kloss, 1922	Evergreen forest	LC^{IUCN} ▼	
	Tenasserim white-bellied rat	Niviventer tenaster Thomas, 1916	Montane forest	LC^{IUCN} Unknown	
	Sikkim rat	Rattus andamanensis Blyth, 1860	Forest	LC^{IUCN}	
	Ricefield rat	Rattus argentiventer Robinson & Kloss, 1916	Grassland	LC^{IUCN}	
	Polynesian rat	Rattus exulans Peale, 1848	Widespread	LC^{IUCN}	
	Lesser ricefield rat	Rattus losea R. Swinhoe, 1871	Grassland and cropland	LC^{IUCN} ▲	
	Brown rat	Rattus norvegicus Berkenhout, 1769	Introduced; Widespread in the presence of humans	LC^{IUCN}	
	Black rat	Rattus rattus Linnaeus, 1758	Introduced; commensal with humans	LC^{IUCN}	
	Tanezumi rat	Rattus tanezumi Temminck, 1844	Forest, shrublands and grasslands	LC^{IUCN} ▲	
	Paulina's limestone rat	Saxatilomys paulinae Musser et al., 2005	Limestone forest	DD^{IUCN} Unknown	
	Asiatic long-tailed climbing mouse	Vandeleuria oleracea Bennett, 1832	Forest, shrublands, grasslands	LC^{IUCN}	

== Order: Scandentia (treeshrews) ==
Image	Common name	Scientific name (authority)	Preferred habitat	IUCN status	Range
Family Tupaiidae: treeshrews
	Northern smooth-tailed treeshrew	Dendrogale murina Schlegel & S. Müller, 1843	Forest	LC^{IUCN} ▼	
	Northern treeshrew	Tupaia belangeri Wagner, 1841	Forest and shrubland	LC^{IUCN}	

== Locally extinct ==
The following species are locally extinct in the country:

- Indian hog deer, Axis porcinus possibly extirpated
- Wild water buffalo, Bubalus arnee
- Sumatran rhinoceros, Dicerorhinus sumatrensis
- Javan rhinoceros, Rhinoceros sondaicus

== See also ==
- List of birds of Laos
