= List of mammals of Chhattisgarh =

This article is a list of the species of mammals found in the Indian state of Chhattisgarh. Due to its recent split from Madhya Pradesh in 2000, state-specific surveys are rarely available. This article combines data from field surveys, books and citizen science platforms like iNaturalist.

== Artiodactyla ==
- Blackbuck, Antilope cervicapra
- Chital, Axis axis
- Zebu, Bos indicus
- Gaur, Bos gaurus
- Domestic cow, Bos taurus
- Nilgai, Boselaphus tragocamelus
- Wild water buffalo, Bubalus arnee
- Water buffalo, Bubalus bubalis
- Chinkara, Gazella bennettii
- Indian spotted chevrotain, Moschiola indica
- Northern red muntjac, Muntiacus vaginalis
- Wild boar, Sus scrofa
- Barasingha, Rucervus duvaucelli
- Sambar deer, Rusa unicolor
- Four-horned antelope, Tetracerus quadricornis

== Carnivora ==
- Golden jackal, Canis aureus
- Domestic dog, Canis familiaris
- Indian wolf, Canis lupus
- Caracal, Caracal caracal
- Dhole, Cuon alpinus
- Domestic cat, Felis catus
- Jungle cat, Felis chaus
- Striped hyena, Hyaena hyaena
- Eurasian otter, Lutra lutra
- Smooth-coated otter, Lutrogale perspicillata
- Ratel, Mellivora capensis
- Sloth bear, Melursus ursinus
- Leopard, Panthera pardus
- Tiger, Panthera tigris
- Asian palm civet, Paradoxurus hermaphroditus
- Leopard cat, Prionailurus bengalensis
- Rusty-spotted cat, Prionailurus rubiginosus
- Fishing cat, Prionailurus viverrinus
- Small Indian mongoose, Urva auropunctata
- Indian grey mongoose, Urva edwardsii
- Ruddy mongoose, Urva smithii
- Small Indian civet, Viverricula indica
- Bengal fox, Vulpes bengalensis

== Chiroptera ==
- Greater short-nosed fruit bat, Cynopterus sphinx
- Khajuria's leaf-nosed bat, Hipposideros durgadasi
- Fulvus roundleaf bat, Hipposideros fulvus
- Cantor's roundleaf bat, Hipposideros galeritus
- Indian roundleaf bat, Hipposideros lankadiva
- Painted bat, Kerivoula picta
- Greater false vampire bat, Megaderma lyra
- Wrinkle-lipped free-tailed bat, Mops plicatus
- Hodgson's bat, Myotis formosus
- Horsfield's bat, Myotis horsfieldii
- Kelaart's pipistrelle, Pipistrellus ceylonicus
- Indian pipistrelle, Pipistrellus coromandra
- Java pipistrelle, Pipistrellus javanicus
- Least pipistrelle, Pipistrellus tenuis
- Indian flying fox, Pteropus giganteus
- Blyth's horseshoe bat, Rhinolophus lepidus
- Rufous horseshoe bat, Rhinolophus rouxii
- Lesser mouse-tailed bat, Rhinopoma hardwickii
- Greater mouse-tailed bat, Rhinopoma microphyllum
- Leschenault's rousette, Rousettus leschenaultii
- Naked-rumped pouched bat, Saccolaimus saccolaimus
- Greater Asiatic yellow bat, Scotophilus heathii
- Lesser Asiatic yellow bat, Scotophilus kuhlii
- Dormer's bat, Scotozous dormeri
- Egyptian free-tailed bat, Tadarida aegyptiaca
- Long-winged tomb bat, Taphozous longimanus
- Black-bearded tomb bat, Taphozous melanopogon
- Naked-rumped tomb bat, Taphozous nudiventris
- Theobald's tomb bat, Taphozous theobaldi

== See also ==
- Flora and fauna of Madhya Pradesh
