= Pipistrellus raceyi =

Conservation status
- Data Deficient (IUCN 3.1)

Scientific classification
- Kingdom: Animalia
- Phylum: Chordata
- Class: Mammalia
- Order: Chiroptera
- Family: Vespertilionidae
- Genus: Pipistrellus
- Species: P. raceyi

Binomial name
- Pipistrellus raceyi Bates, Ratrimomanarivo, Harrison, and Goodman, 2006
- Distribution of Pipistrellus raceyi

Species of bat from Madagascar

Pipistrellus raceyi, also known as Racey's pipistrelle, is a bat from Madagascar, in the genus Pipistrellus. Although unidentified species of Pipistrellus had been previously reported from Madagascar since the 1990s, P. raceyi was not formally named until 2006. It is apparently most closely related to the Asian species P. endoi, P. paterculus, and P. abramus, and its ancestors probably reached Madagascar from Asia. P. raceyi has been recorded at four sites, two in the eastern and two in the western lowlands. In the east, it is found in open areas and has been found roosting in a building; in the west it occurs in dry forest. Because of uncertainties about its ecology, it is listed as "Data Deficient" on the IUCN Red List.

With a forearm length of 28.0 to 31.2 mm (1.10 to 1.23 in), Pipistrellus raceyi is small to medium-sized for a species of Pipistrellus. The body is reddish above and yellow-brown below. The wings are dark and the feet are small. Males have a long penis and baculum (penis bone), which is somewhat similar to those of P. endoi, P. abramus and P. paterculus. In the skull, the rostrum (front part) is less flat than in related species and the supraorbital ridges (above the eyes) are prominent. The fourth upper premolar does not touch the upper canine and the second lower premolar is well-developed.

== Taxonomy ==
Since they were first recorded in 1905, when Thomas and Schwann described the species Vespertilio matroka (currently Neoromicia matroka), the classification and status of small vespertilionid bats ("pipistrelles") from Madagascar have remained unclear. Although several species were recorded, they remained little known. A species of the genus Pipistrellus with affinities to Oriental (southeastern Asian) species was first recorded in 1995, and several later authors recorded one or more unidentified Pipistrellus species.

In 2006, Paul Bates and colleagues reported on a collection of 44 Malagasy "pipistrelles" received by the Harrison Institute, which included several species new to Madagascar, as well as a single species new to science. This species, a member of Pipistrellus, was described as Pipistrellus raceyi. In a 2007 article, Steven Goodman mentioned it as part of a flurry of new bat species from Madagascar; the number of species increased from 27 in 1995 to 37 in 2007. The specific name, raceyi, honors bat researcher Paul Racey and the describers suggested the common name "Racey's pipistrelle bat". P. raceyi closely resembles the Asian species P. endoi, P. paterculus, and P. abramus, and Bates and colleagues hypothesized that it may be related to these species. If this is true, the ancestors of P. raceyi presumably reached Madagascar from Asia, not from Africa like most of the island's bat fauna. P. raceyi shares this distinction with a few other Malagasy bats: the large fruit bat Pteropus rufus and both species of the small insectivorous bat Emballonura recorded on Madagascar.

== Description ==
Pipistrellus raceyi is a small to medium-sized pipistrelle. It is long-furred and the body is reddish above, with the head a trifle darker, and yellowish-brown below. The glandular swellings on the muzzle, next to the nose, are hairless. The dark, short, round ears bear three to five ridges. The crescent-shaped tragus (a projection on the inner side of the outer ear) is about half as long as the ear and contains a slight constriction on the back side of its base. The wings are dark. The third through fifth metacarpals (hand bones) are about equally long, but the first phalange (finger bone) on the third finger is short. P. endoi has a longer first phalange on the third metacarpal. P. raceyi has short tibiae (lower leg bones) and small feet and the tail is shorter than the head and body. Forearm length is 28.0 to 31.2 mm (1.10 to 1.23 in), tail length is 22.9 to 30.3 mm (0.90 to 1.19 in), hindfoot length is 5.3 to 7.5 mm (0.21 to 0.30 in), and ear length is 7.5 to 10.6 mm (0.30 to 0.42 in) in 13 measured specimens. Females average slightly larger than males.

Males have a long, straight penis with a notch between the shaft and the narrow, egg-shaped glans penis. Near the top, the penis is haired, but the base is almost naked. In the baculum (penis bone), the shaft is long and narrow and slightly curved. The length of the penis and baculum distinguish P. raceyi from all comparably sized African and Malagasy vespertilionids. P. endoi, P. paterculus, and P. abramus have more similar bacula, but that of P. abramus is more curved, the shaft and the tip are more robust in P. paterculus, and the proximal (near) end is more robust in P. endoi. In males, penis length is 9.6 to 11.8 mm (0.38 to 0.46 in) and baculum length is 8.8 to 10.0 mm (0.35 to 0.39 in).

In the skull, there is a well-defined lowered area in the middle of the rostrum (front part), which nearly touches the back margin of the large, V-shaped nasal aperture (opening for the nose). Next to the aperture are two elevated areas, above the incisors. The zygomatic arches (cheekbones) are slender. The supraorbital ridges (located above the eyes) are well-developed. P. abramus, P. endoi, and P. paterculus have a flatter rostrum and less prominent supraorbital ridges. The braincase is of average size and bears a poorly developed sagittal crest on its roof. The supraoccipital, the backmost part of the skull, is convex. The sides of the concave palate are about parallel.

The dental formula is 2.1.2.33.1.2.3 (two incisors, one canine, two premolars, and three molars in the upper jaw, and three incisors, one canine, two premolars, and three molars in the lower jaw). Because the ancestors of P. raceyi lost the first upper incisor and first and third upper and lower premolars, the upper incisors are designated I2 and I3 and the premolars are designated P2 and P4 (uppers) and p2 and p4 (lowers). I2 has a well-developed second cusp in addition to the main cusp and I3 about reaches the height of the second cusp of I2. The stout upper canine bears a single cusp. P2 is prominent and is displaced slightly towards the inner side of the toothrow. P4 does not contact the canine. The first and second upper molar (M1 and M2) are about equally large, but M3 is smaller. Each of the lower incisors bears three cusps and the third (i3) may touch the lower canine (c1). The latter tooth has a second cusp, which reaches higher than i3. The p2 touches the back of c1 and attains between 59-100% the crown area of p4. The first two lower molars (m1 and m2) have the back group of cusps (talonid) larger than the front one (trigonid), and m3 is again smaller.

== Distribution, ecology, and behavior ==
Pipistrellus raceyi is known from four places on Madagascar, all below 80 m (260 ft) altitude, of which two are on the west and two on the east side of the island. Among the eastern collection sites, Kianjavato is a rural town surrounded by farmland and secondary forests, where P. raceyi were collected while leaving a hollow in the concrete wall of a house and in a mistnet over a river, and Tampolo is in a heavily disturbed agriculturally used area. Both western localities, Kirindy and Mikea, are in dry forest. In Kirindy, the pipistrelle Hypsugo anchietae has also been recorded. The true distribution of P. raceyi is probably larger than that currently known. Nothing is known about the diet, but vespertilionid bats generally eat insects.

There is very limited data on reproduction. Young are probably born near the start of the rainy season, in November–December, when food is plentiful. Six bats were caught at the roost site in Kianjavato, of which only one was a male; this led Bates and colleagues to suggest that the species may be polygynous, with groups consisting of a male and multiple females.

== Conservation status ==
The IUCN Red List has assessed Pipistrellus raceyi as "Data Deficient" because of insufficient knowledge about its abundance and habitat requirements. All four known sites are near forest, but that may be a sampling artifact. Although deforestation may pose a threat, each of the collection sites has some sort of forest protection measures in place.

== Literature cited ==
- Bates, P.J.J., Ratrimomanarivo, F.H., Harrison, D.L. and Goodman, S.M. 2006. A description of a new species of Pipistrellus (Chiroptera: Vespertilionidae) from Madagascar with a review of related Vespertilioninae from the island (subscription required). Acta Chiropterologica 8(2):299–324.
- Emmons, L.H. and Feer, F. 1997. Neotropical Rainforest Mammals: A Field Guide. 2nd ed. The University of Chicago Press, 307 pp. ISBN 0-226-20721-8
- Goodman, S.M. 2007. An island of discoveries: Madagascar reveals a swarm of new bat species. Bats 25(2):12–14.
- Hill, J.E. and Harrison, D.L. 1987. The baculum in the Vespertilioninae (Chiroptera: Vespertilionidae) with a systematic review, a synopsis of Pipistrellus and Eptesicus, and the descriptions of a new genus and subgenus. Bulletin of the British Museum (Natural History), Zoology Series 52(7):225–305.
- Jenkins, R.K.B.; Rakotoarivelo, A.R.; Ratrimomanarivo, F.H.; Cardiff, S.G. (2019). "Pipistrellus raceyi". IUCN Red List of Threatened Species. 2019 e.T136646A21989768.
