= Christmas Island pipistrelle =

Conservation status
- Extinct (2009) (IUCN 3.1)

Scientific classification
- Kingdom: Animalia
- Phylum: Chordata
- Class: Mammalia
- Order: Chiroptera
- Family: Vespertilionidae
- Genus: Alionoctula
- Species: †A. murrayi

Binomial name
- †Alionoctula murrayi (Andrews, 1900)

Synonyms
- Pipistrellus murrayi Pipistrellus tenuis murrayi

Extinct species of bat

Location of Christmas Island in southeast Asia

The Christmas Island pipistrelle (Alionoctula murrayi) is an extinct species of vesper bat that was found only on Christmas Island. It was the only microbat on Christmas Island and the smallest species of bat in any Australian territory. During the day it roosted under peeling tree bark or within tree hollows, and at night it foraged for insects. Females gave birth once a year to a single offspring, and they may have had lifespans of 7–15 years.

Until the 1980s, it was a common bat found throughout Christmas Island. A variety of ecological disturbances affected Christmas Island in the 20th century, particularly the introduction of invasive species such as the yellow crazy ant, common wolf snake, and giant centipede, and it is presumed that a combination of factors led to the pipistrelle's decline. Its continuous and drastic decline through the 1990s and early 2000s was extensively monitored and studied.

Calls to establish a captive breeding program began in 2006 but went unheeded. By January 2009, there were perhaps only 20 individuals left. When the Australian government approved a captive breeding program in July 2009, there was a just single individual that eluded capture for several weeks. It was detected for the final time on 26 August 2009, making it the first Australian mammal to become extinct in 50 years. The failure to prevent its extinction illustrated a gap between researchers gathering information and policymakers acting upon it, with authors of a 2011 article in Conservation Letters using the pipistrelle's extinction trajectory to emphasize the need to make critical conservation decisions while the opportunity is viable.

== Taxonomy and etymology ==
The Christmas Island pipistrelle was described as a new species in 1900 by British paleontologist Charles William Andrews, who named it Pipistrellus murrayi. Its species epithet, murrayi, honors Sir John Murray, who helped pay for Andrews's expedition to Christmas Island.

It has sometimes been considered conspecific with the least pipistrelle (P. tenuis); however, revisions of the genus based on baculum morphology classified Pipistrellus murrayi as a distinct species. Genetic work conducted for the Australian government in 2009 supported this conclusion, indicating that the Christmas Island pipistrelle was closely related to but distinct from other Asian pipistrelles.

A 2025 revision of Pipistrellus found that the genus, as historically circumscribed, was paraphyletic and did not accurately portray evolutionary relationships between its species. As a result, the Christmas Island pipistrelle and many other species were moved to the genus Alionoctula.

== Description ==
It was a small bat weighing around 3–4.5 g (0.11–0.16 oz). It had dark brown fur, with the tips of its hairs yellowish. Its forearm was 30–33 mm (1.2–1.3 in) long. It was the smallest described species of bat in Australia. Its ears were triangular and rounded at the tips. Its uropatagium (flight membrane between the hind limbs) had a distinct calcar, which is a cartilage structure along the edge of the uropatagium. Its tail protruded very slightly (2 mm (0.079 in)) past the uropatagium. Some of its dimensions were:

- Head and body length: 35–40 mm (1.4–1.6 in)
- Tail length: 30–31 mm (1.2–1.2 in)
- Ear length: 9–11 mm (0.35–0.43 in)
- Hind foot length: 6–8 mm (0.24–0.31 in)

== Biology ==
The Christmas Island pipistrelle was nocturnal and roosted during the day in old-growth forest. Its documented roost sites included under peeling tree bark, within tree hollows, under dead palm fronds, and between a strangler fig and a tree trunk. They roosted solitarily or in small colonies of up to 50 individuals. Roost fidelity varied, with some individuals switching roosts daily while others used the same roost for a week or more consecutively. Roost switching often occurred within the same area, with the distance between roosts ranging from 14–186 m (46–610 ft).

At night, the pipistrelle foraged for its insect prey along forest edges, using echolocation to detect and catch flying moths and beetles. It foraged both above and below the forest canopy.

Females formed maternity colonies of up to 50 individuals. They were seasonal breeders, with females likely becoming pregnant in September. Females were capable of storing sperm, meaning that there could have been a delay between copulation and fertilization. After a gestation period of three months, they gave birth in late December, which coincided with the beginning of the wet season where insects were more abundant. The young, called pups, were flightless and likely only 1 g (0.035 oz) at birth and were left behind at the roost at night while the mother foraged. It had a low fecundity, with females producing a single pup per year. Its lifespan was unknown, but was estimated at seven years for individuals who survived to fledge. Closely related species of bat live for about fifteen years in captivity.

== Range and habitat ==
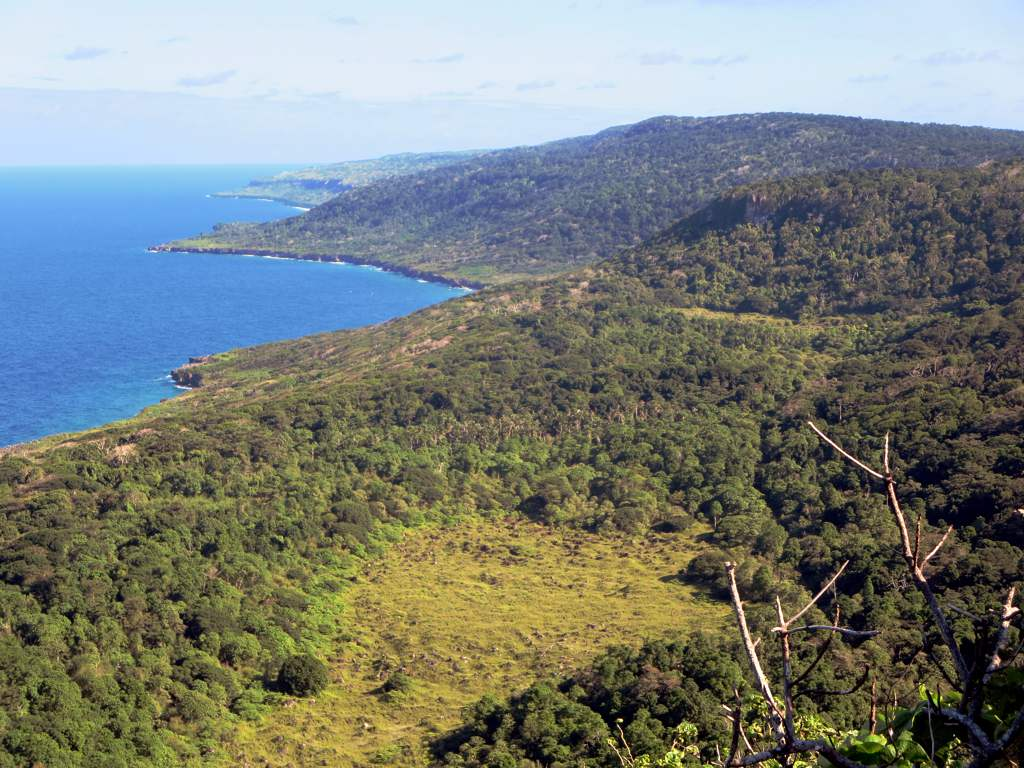
Eastern coast of Christmas Island

The Christmas Island pipistrelle was endemic to Christmas Island, a small island of 135 km^{2} (52 mi^{2}) in the Indian Ocean that is a territory of Australia. In 1910, naturalist Frederic Wood Jones reported vagrant Christmas Island pipistrelles on the Cocos Islands, though no further observations or collections corroborate this observation. It relied on mature primary forests for roosting and foraged in both primary and secondary forests. As late as 1985, the Christmas Island pipistrelle was described as "common" and distributed throughout the island, including in Flying Fish Cove, which is the main settlement of Christmas Island. It was the only species of microbat found on Christmas Island.

== Decline and extinction ==
=== Factors ===
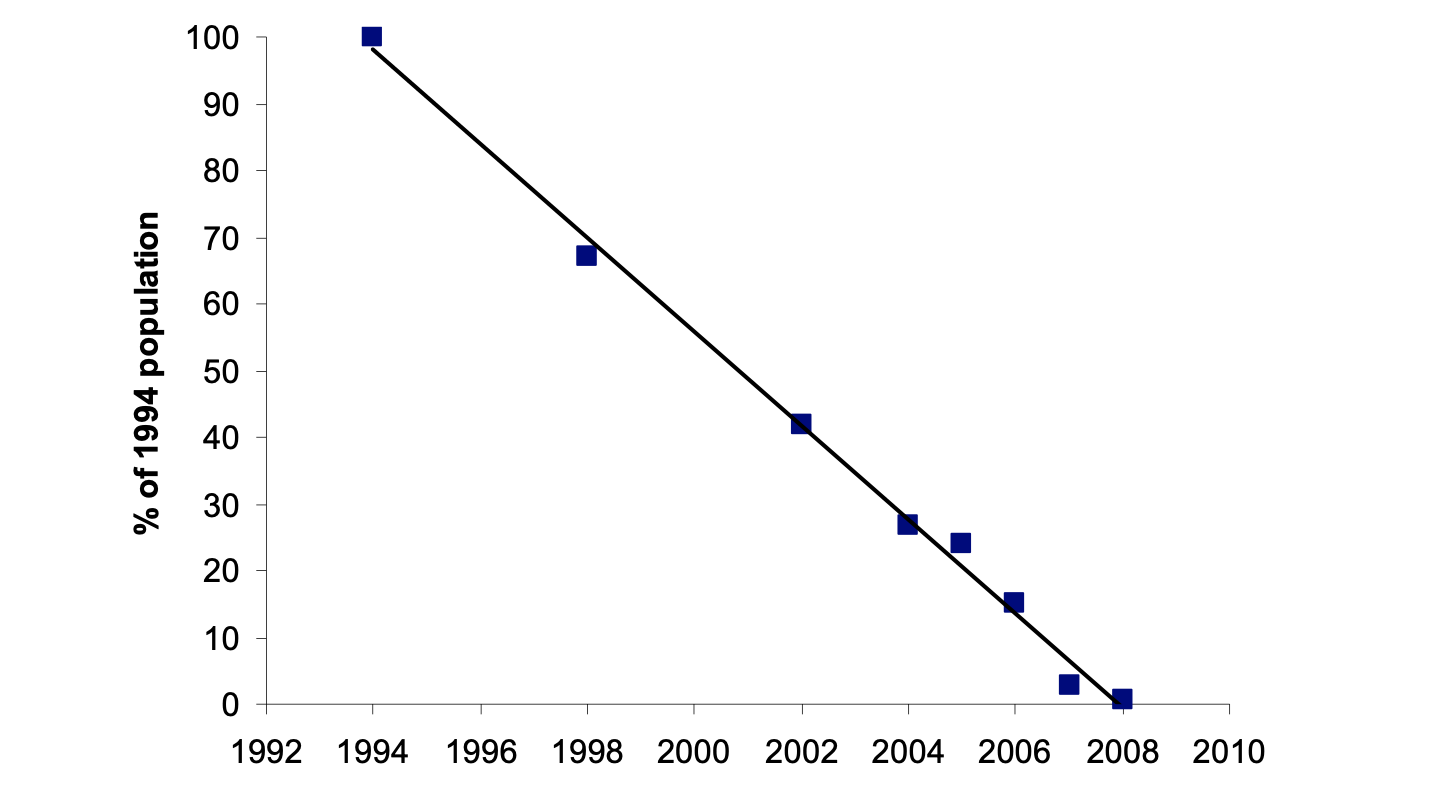
Decline of the Christmas Island pipistrelle relative to its 1994 population

The Christmas Island pipistrelle declined dramatically from 1990 onwards. The cause of its decline is unknown, though several factors could have contributed. Explanations considered by researchers include habitat destruction, introduction of invasive species, the use of insecticides causing poisoning or loss of insect prey, disease, or an ecological cascade from the interaction of invasive species with a lowered water table.

The rainforests on Christmas Island were extensively clearcut to facilitate phosphate mining, negatively impacting both the pipistrelle's roosting and foraging habitat. Clearcutting stopped in 1987, so it is suspected that other factors had a more serious impact on the terminal decline of the species. To see if disease was causing its rapid decline, researchers took blood cultures, swabbed for respiratory diseases, and looked for internal and external parasites. Examined individuals were apparently healthy with the exception of a lower level of white blood cells than similar species of bat, which could have been due to disease or toxicant exposure. The insecticide fipronil was widely used on Christmas Island from 2001–2004 to control the yellow crazy ant. The pipistrelles would have been exposed to fipronil through ingestion of insect prey. Fipronil could have accumulated in their bodies at higher concentrations with unknown effects.

Human contact introduced a variety of invasive species to Christmas Island. Between 1915 and 1934, the yellow crazy ant was accidentally introduced, eventually forming supercolonies with multiple queens. A supercolony's size could be several hundred hectares, and the yellow crazy ants' range covered a quarter of the total rainforest area at their peak infestation before widespread poisoning efforts. While the ants nested on the ground, they climbed trees to forage, where they may have interacted with roosting bats. The exact effects of the ants on the Christmas Island pipistrelle are unknown, but the ants are known to prey on mammals in other parts of their range, and researchers did document a fatal ant attack on a Christmas Island pipistrelle once. As well as directly killing the bats, the ants may have been a significant source of stress that negatively impacted their survival and reproduction. The ants' intense depredation of other wildlife may have also contributed to a scarcity in prey for the bats.

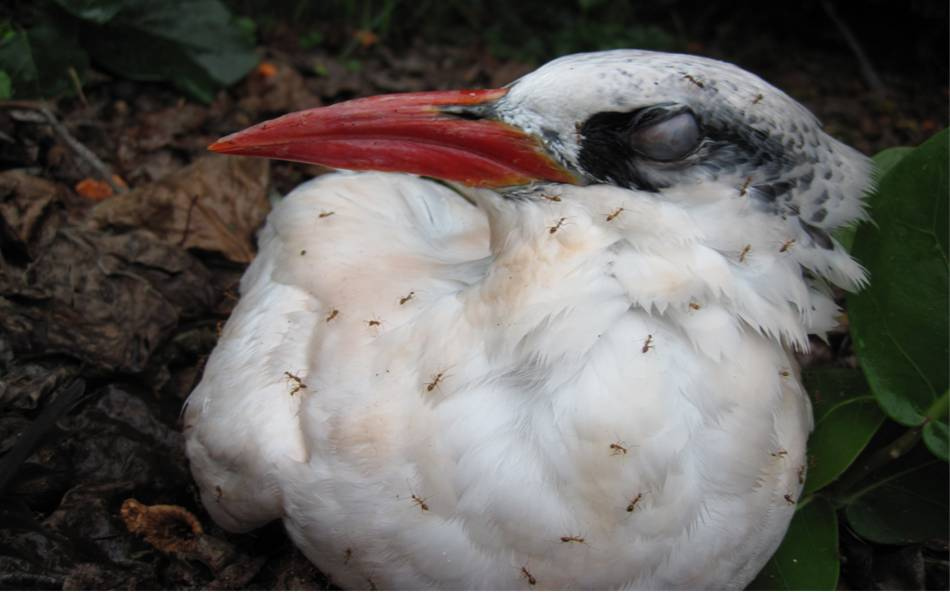
Yellow crazy ants attacking a red-tailed tropicbird

The common wolf snake, also an invasive species, likely had a negative impact as well. The timing of its introduction to Christmas Island immediately preceded the decline of the pipistrelle. As the common wolf snake expanded its range in Christmas Island, the pipistrelle stopped being detected in those same areas the snake inhabited. The wolf snake is not an adept tree climber, though, and mostly preyed on lizards. Given that the pipistrelle's young were clustered in roosts and their reproduction rate was so low, even occasional depredation of a maternity roost could have had an outsize impact on the population. Other invasives that could have become its predators are feral cats, black rats, Nankeen kestrels and giant centipedes (Scolopendra subspinipes, sometimes incorrectly listed as Scolopendra morsitans which is not found on Christmas Island).

The species' decline could have been the result of an ecological cascade. Authors of a 2009 expert working group report speculated the following chain of events might have been the primary driver of the population collapse:

1. Invasive species, including yellow crazy ants, giant centipedes, and scale insects, are accidentally introduced.
2. Pipistrelle populations decline in the 1980s and 1990s due to direct or indirect effects of yellow crazy ants.
3. Drought or human water use lowers the island's water table, stressing rainforest trees and increasing scale insect populations.
4. Yellow crazy ants begin farming scale insects, allowing the proliferation of sooty mold on rainforest trees, further stressing the trees.
5. Ant populations explode, forming supercolonies, and scale insect numbers grow rapidly.
6. The ants reduce populations of the Christmas Island red crab, a keystone species. The ants become significant predators of roosting pipistrelles.
7. Red crabs no longer meaningfully suppress litter levels on the forest floor, allowing the proliferation of giant centipedes, which become significant predators of roosting pipistrelles.
8. Efforts to control the ants with fipronil reduce populations of the pipistrelle's insect prey.

=== Unsuccessful conservation attempts ===
In response to its declining numbers, several conservation measures were undertaken: Researchers identified roost trees and installed protective barriers around them to deter predators; artificial roosts were erected; and yellow crazy ant colonies were controlled within the bats' remaining range. Efforts to protect roosts were complicated by the bats' habits of frequently switching trees. The seven artificial roosts, installed near existing roost trees, never showed any signs that the bats used them.

The Christmas Island pipistrelle was listed as endangered in 2004 under the Australian Environment Protection and Biodiversity Conservation Act 1999. In 2006, its status was reassessed as critically endangered and Australia's Threatened Species Scientific Committee called for the establishment of a captive breeding program. The captive breeding recommendation was echoed by Lindy Lumsden et al. in 2007 in a report to the Australian Minister for Resources as well as in a 2008 report from the Director of National Parks. Acoustic surveys showed a 99.4% decline in detection of the bat from January 2006 to January 2009. A reassessment of the number of individuals remaining in January 2009 suggested there may have been as few as 20 pipistrelles left. The last remaining communal roost contained only four individuals. Three years prior, there had been 54 individuals in this colony, and there were several other known, similar-sized colonies. Despite predictions that the species would likely be extinct within six months, the Australian government deferred capture attempts of the Christmas Island pipistrelle. They instead initiated a captivity program for northern pipistrelles and forest pipistrelles to attempt to understand how to manage closely related but more abundant pipistrelles in captivity.

In July 2009, the Australian government announced that it would attempt to rescue the species by bringing the last remaining individuals into captivity. However, just one bat was found over four weeks of surveying. Researchers were unable to catch it, and its last echolocation call was recorded on 26 August 2009. As it was the only echolocating bat species on the island, and there was a network of acoustic bat monitors, scientists Lindy Lumsden, Paul Racey, and Anthony Hutson noted, "This is one of the few times that an extinction of a species in the wild can be marked to the day." On 8 September 2009, the Australian government announced that attempts to capture the bats had failed. No Christmas Island pipistrelles have been seen or heard since, and the species is now extinct. It is believed to be the first mammal extinction in Australia in 50 years.

A 2014 analysis that modeled wildlife management strategies stated that the captive breeding program should have immediately commenced in 2006 after it was suggested, but the political and social consequences of shifting course were difficult for decision-makers to bear. The program would have cost AU$500,000 annually but was predicted to have a high chance of success. The significant resources and time spent managing the species in the wild was sunk cost, and abandoning those efforts as failed could have been seen as embarrassing. Additionally, success of captive breeding was not guaranteed, and its failure would only be known after millions of dollars were already invested in the attempt.

Other scientists pointed to the discrepancy between collecting information and acting on it—the decline of the Christmas Island pipistrelle was charted for decades, but decisions to act to conserve the species were put off until they were too late. The authors of a 2012 post-mortem noted that policymakers had four choices in responding to the captive breeding program proposal in 2006: immediately begin the program; maintain research and mitigation of threats on Christmas Island; choose to do nothing in favor of spending limited resources on other threatened species with better odds of survival; inaction or delay of decision making. In apparently choosing the last option, they noted that the pipistrelle was "monitored to extinction" which was perhaps avoidable.
