= Pipistrellus aladdin =

Conservation status
- Data Deficient (IUCN 3.1)

Scientific classification
- Kingdom: Animalia
- Phylum: Chordata
- Class: Mammalia
- Order: Chiroptera
- Family: Vespertilionidae
- Genus: Pipistrellus
- Species: P. aladdin

Binomial name
- Pipistrellus aladdin Thomas, 1905

Synonyms
- Pipistrellus pipistrellus aladdin Thomas, 1905; Pipistrellus pipistrellus bactrianus Satunin, 1905

Species of bat

Pipistrellus aladdin, the Turkestan pipistrelle, is a species of bat in the family Vespertilionidae. It is found in Central Asia and Afghanistan. It is assessed as data-deficient by the IUCN.

== Taxonomy ==
It was described as a new species in 1905 by British mammalogist Oldfield Thomas. The holotype had been collected near Isfahan, Iran by Richard Bowen Woosnam during an expedition led by Arthur Churchill Bailward. Its taxonomic status has since been debated: various authors have considered it a full species or a subspecies of the Indian pipistrelle (P. coromandra) or the common pipistrelle (P. pipistrellus). Its status remains in dispute as of 2023, and it is considered invalid by the Integrated Taxonomic Information System.

== Description ==
It is similar in appearance to the common pipistrelle but it has lighter fur. The edge of its wing and tail flight membranes is white. Individuals have a total length of 69–82 mm (2.7–3.2 in) and a forearm length of 27–35 mm (1.1–1.4 in). It weighs 3.4–5.6 g (0.12–0.20 oz).

== Biology ==
Pipistrellus aladdin is insectivorous, consuming small moths and flies.

== Habitat and distribution ==
The bat is found in Afghanistan, China, Iran, Kazakhstan, Kyrgyzstan, Tajikistan, Turkmenistan, and Uzbekistan.

It inhabits open woodland, semi-desert, farmland, rural gardens and urban areas, and roosts mainly in buildings, trees, cracks in cliffs and caves.
