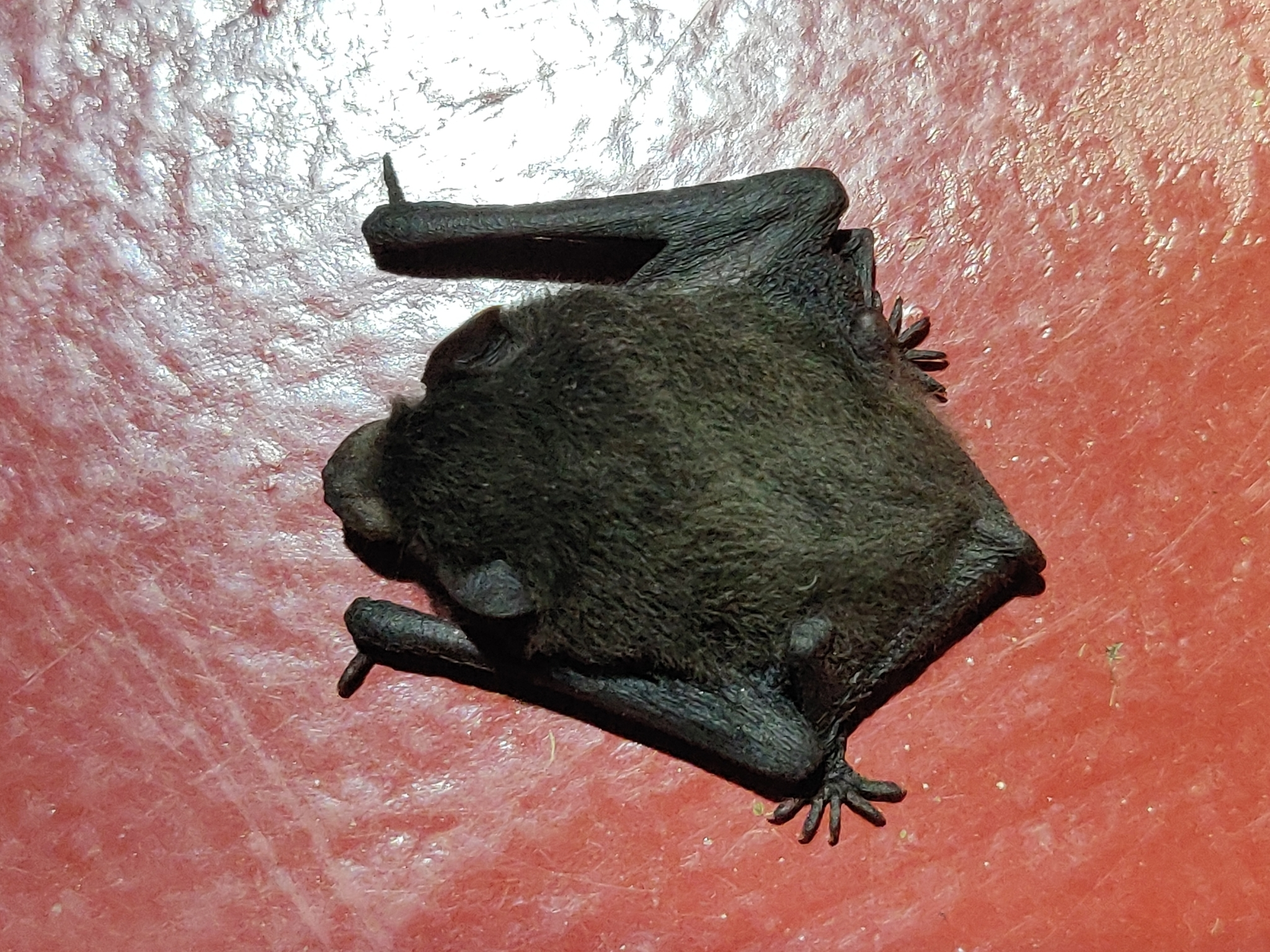
- Indian pipistrelle, Alionoctula coromandra

Scientific classification
- Kingdom: Animalia
- Phylum: Chordata
- Class: Mammalia
- Infraclass: Placentalia
- Order: Chiroptera
- Family: Vespertilionidae
- Subfamily: Vespertilioninae
- Tribe: Pipistrellini
- Genus: Alionoctula; Kruskop, Solovyeva and Kaznadzey, 2018

Type species
- Vesperugo stenopterus Dobson, 1875

Species
- See text

= Alionoctula =

Genus of bats

Alionoctula is a genus of bats in the family Vespertilionidae and subfamily Vespertilioninae.

Species in this genus were previously all classified under the genus Pipistrellus, but were reclassified after a 2025 study demonstrated that the group was non-monophyletic.

== Species ==
According to Mammal Diversity Database:

- Japanese pipistrelle, A. abramus
- Forest pipistrelle, A. adamsi
- New Guinea pipistrelle, A. angulata
- Babu's pipistrelle, A. babu
- Kelaart's pipistrelle, A. ceylonica
- Greater Papuan pipistrelle, A. collina
- Indian pipistrelle, A. coromandra
- Dhofar pipistrelle, A. dhofarensis
- Endo's pipistrelle, A. endoi
- Javan pipistrelle, A. javanica
- Minahassa pipistrelle, A. minahassae
- †Christmas Island pipistrelle, A. murrayi
- Lesser Papuan pipistrelle, A. papuana
- Mount Popa pipistrelle, A. paterculus
- Narrow-winged pipistrelle, A. stenoptera
- †Sturdee's pipistrelle, A. sturdeei
- Least pipistrelle, A. tenuis
- Watts's pipistrelle, A. wattsi
- Northern pipistrelle, A. westralis
