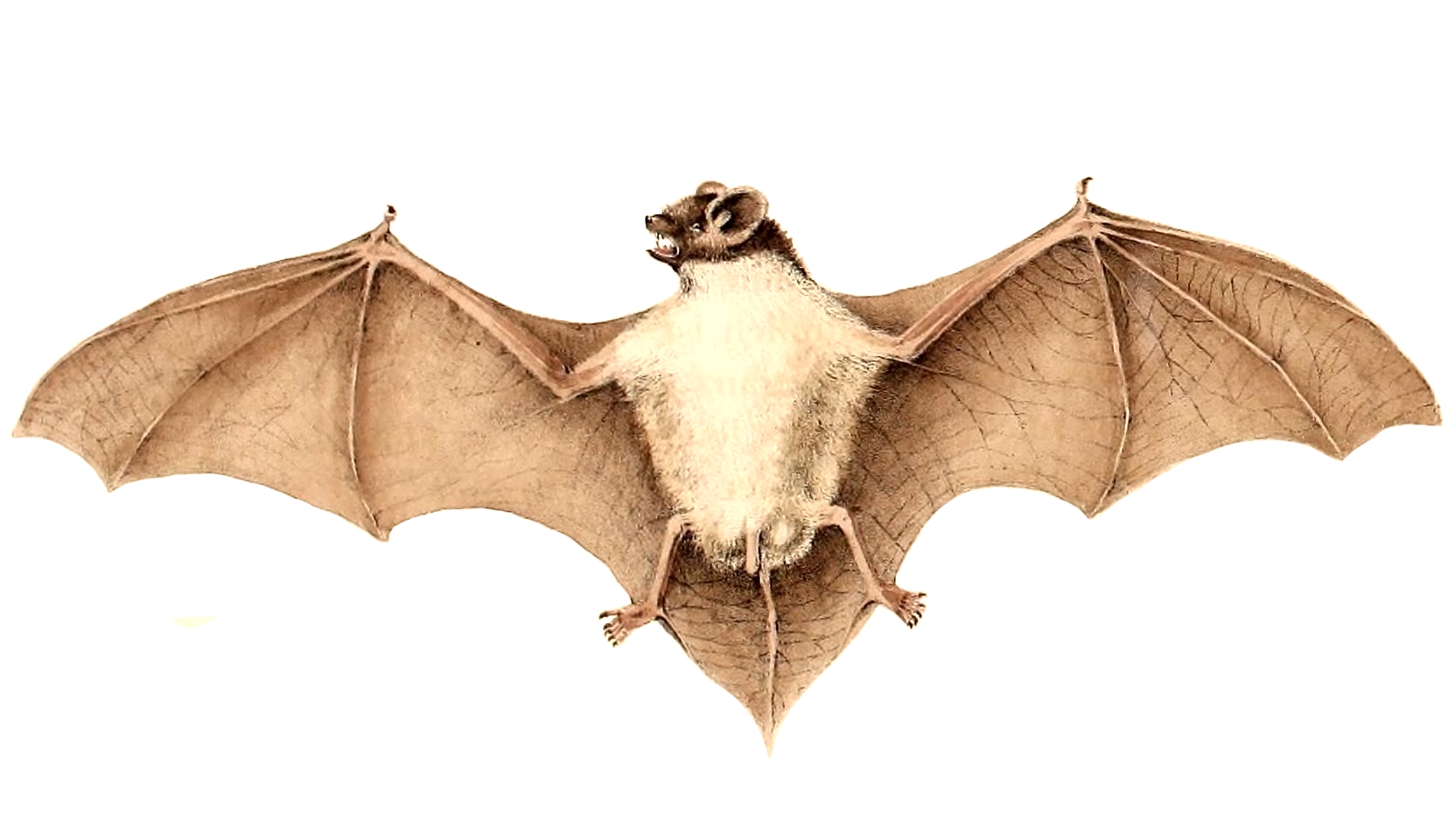

Conservation status
- Least Concern (IUCN 3.1)

Scientific classification
- Kingdom: Animalia
- Phylum: Chordata
- Class: Mammalia
- Order: Chiroptera
- Family: Vespertilionidae
- Tribe: Pipistrellini
- Genus: Vansonia; Roberts, 1946
- Species: V. rueppellii

Binomial name
- Vansonia rueppellii (J. Fischer, 1829)

Synonyms
- Pipistrellus rueppellii

= Rüppell's bat =

Species of mammals belonging to a microbat family

Rüppell's bat (Vansonia rueppellii), also known as Rüppell's pipistrelle, is a species of vesper bat found in Africa and Asian republics such as Iraq and Israel. It is the only member of the genus Vansonia. It is found in dry and moist savanna, subtropical or tropical dry shrubland, and hot deserts.

== Taxonomy ==
It was formerly classified in the genus Pipistrellus, as its most basal member, but phylogenetic evidence supports it forming the separate genus Vansonia. Senegalese specimens of Vansonia rueppellii can be confidently assigned to V. r. senegalensis, which is distributed from Algeria to Senegal. After testing the influence of phylogeny, V. rueppellii was found to be basal to the Pipistrellus/Nyctalus clade.

== Description ==
The species is 10 centimetres (3.9 in) long while its tail is 3.8 centimetres (1.5 in) long and its forearm is no more than 3.4 centimetres (1.3 in). It weighs only 7 grams (0.25 oz).

== Habitat ==
It is not unusual to find them in crevices, rocks and buildings of various kinds.
