= Watts's pipistrelle =

Watt's pipistrelle

Conservation status
- Least Concern (IUCN 3.1)

Scientific classification
- Kingdom: Animalia
- Phylum: Chordata
- Class: Mammalia
- Infraclass: Placentalia
- Order: Chiroptera
- Family: Vespertilionidae
- Genus: Alionoctula
- Species: A. wattsi

Binomial name
- Alionoctula wattsi (Kitchener, Caputi & Jones, 1986)

Species of bat

Watts's pipistrelle (Alionoctula wattsi) is a species of vesper bat found only in Papua New Guinea.
