= Minahassa pipistrelle =

Conservation status
- Data Deficient (IUCN 3.1)

Scientific classification
- Kingdom: Animalia
- Phylum: Chordata
- Class: Mammalia
- Infraclass: Placentalia
- Order: Chiroptera
- Family: Vespertilionidae
- Genus: Alionoctula
- Species: A. minahassae

Binomial name
- Alionoctula minahassae (Meyer, 1899)

Species of bat

The Minahassa pipistrelle (Alionoctula minahassae) is a species of vesper bat found in Indonesia.
