= Dormer's bat =

Conservation status
- Least Concern (IUCN 3.1)

Scientific classification
- Kingdom: Animalia
- Phylum: Chordata
- Class: Mammalia
- Order: Chiroptera
- Family: Vespertilionidae
- Tribe: Pipistrellini
- Genus: Scotozous; Dobson, 1875
- Species: S. dormeri

Binomial name
- Scotozous dormeri Dobson, 1875

Synonyms
- Pipistrellus dormeri (Dobson, 1875)

Species of bat

Dormer's bat or Dormer's pipistrelle (Scotozous dormeri) is a species of vesper bat. It is the only species in its genus. It is found in Bangladesh, Bhutan, India, and Pakistan. Its natural habitats are subtropical and tropical dry forests, arable land, plantations, rural gardens, and urban areas.

The holotype for this species was from the Bellary Hills in Southern India and was collected by James Charlemagne Dormer, after whom it is named. Bat flies found on this species include: Basilia fletcheri.
