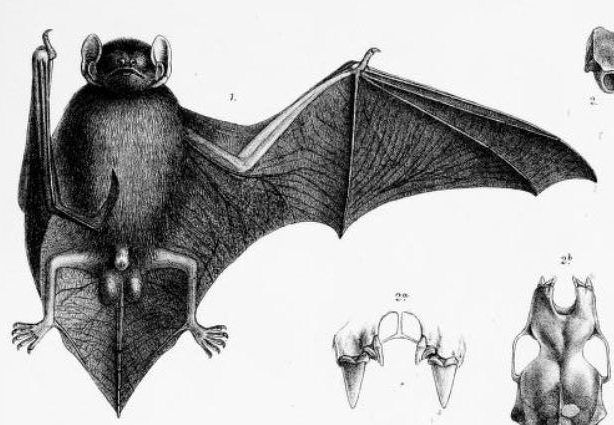

Conservation status
- Least Concern (IUCN 3.1)

Scientific classification
- Kingdom: Animalia
- Phylum: Chordata
- Class: Mammalia
- Infraclass: Placentalia
- Order: Chiroptera
- Family: Vespertilionidae
- Genus: Alionoctula
- Species: A. stenoptera

Binomial name
- Alionoctula stenoptera (Dobson, 1875)
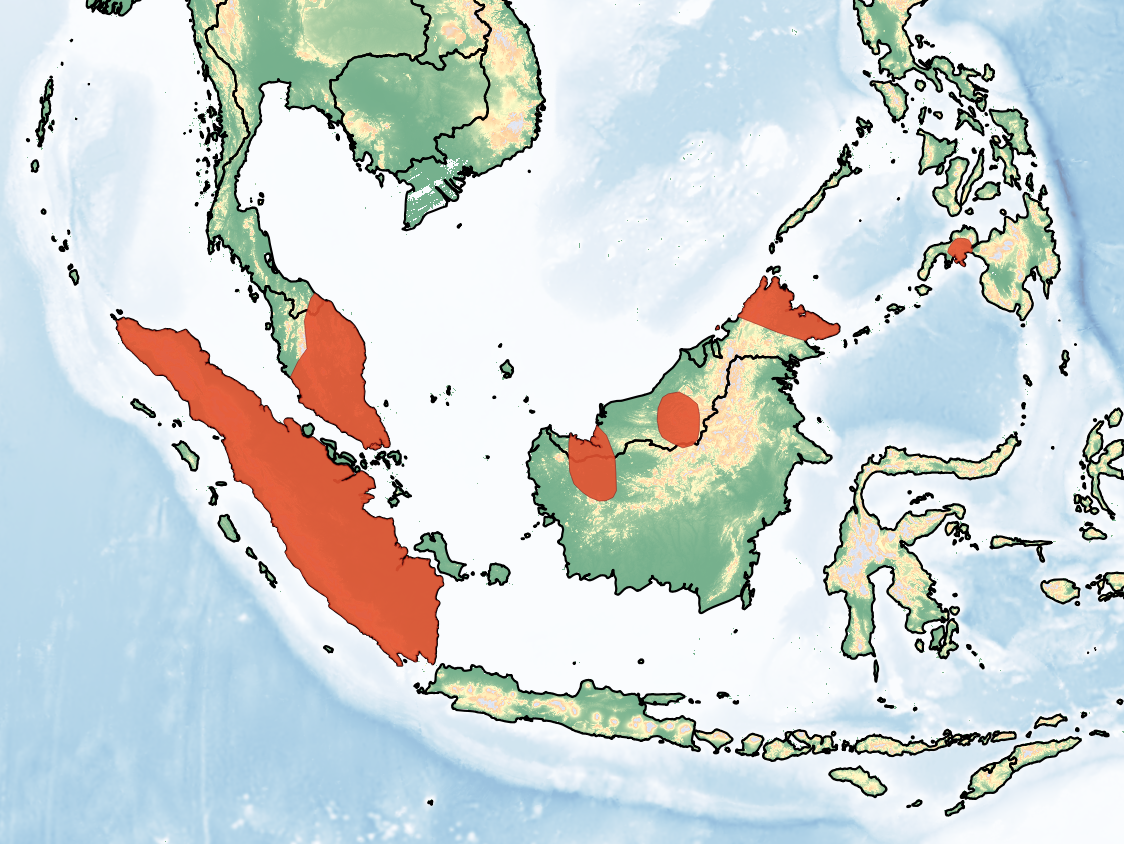

= Narrow-winged pipistrelle =

Species of bat

The narrow-winged pipistrelle (Alionoctula stenoptera) is a species of vesper bat. It can be found in Singapore, Brunei Darussalam, Indonesia, and Malaysia.
