= Dhofar pipistrelle =

Scientific classification
- Kingdom: Animalia
- Phylum: Chordata
- Class: Mammalia
- Order: Chiroptera
- Family: Vespertilionidae
- Genus: Alionoctula
- Species: A. dhofarensis

Binomial name
- Alionoctula dhofarensis (Benda, Reiter, Uhrin & Varadínová, 2016)

Species of bat

The Dhofar pipistrelle (Alionoctula dhofarensis) is a species of vesper bat in the genus Alionoctula. It is found in Southern Arabia, including Oman and Yemen.

== Taxonomy ==
Alionoctula dhofarensis was described as a new species in 2016. The holotype was collected at Ain Tabruq spring in the Dhofar Governorate of Oman, which is reflected in its species name "dhofarensis".

== Description ==
Alionoctula dhofarensis is considered a medium- or large-bodied bat relative to other Pipistrellus species. It has a forearm length of 33–39 mm (1.3–1.5 in). It has a robust skull with a long and broad snout; the braincase is broad and very high. Two color variations are known: some individuals are grayish-brown with a silvery tint, while others are reddish-brown. Both color morphs have belly fur that is paler than their back fur. Its face, ears, and wing membranes are all dark grayish-brown.

== Range and habitat ==
The species occurs in a very limited area situated between easternmost Yemen and south-western Oman. Its habitat is humid savanna. It has been documented at elevations of 59–735 m (194–2,411 ft) above sea level. It is one of four bat species that are endemic to Southern Arabia, the other three being the Yemeni mouse-tailed bat, Yemeni trident leaf-nosed bat, and the Arabian trident bat.
