= Hairy-faced bat =

Conservation status
- Least Concern (IUCN 3.1)

Scientific classification
- Kingdom: Animalia
- Phylum: Chordata
- Class: Mammalia
- Order: Chiroptera
- Family: Vespertilionidae
- Genus: Myotis
- Species: M. annectans

Binomial name
- Myotis annectans Dobson, 1871
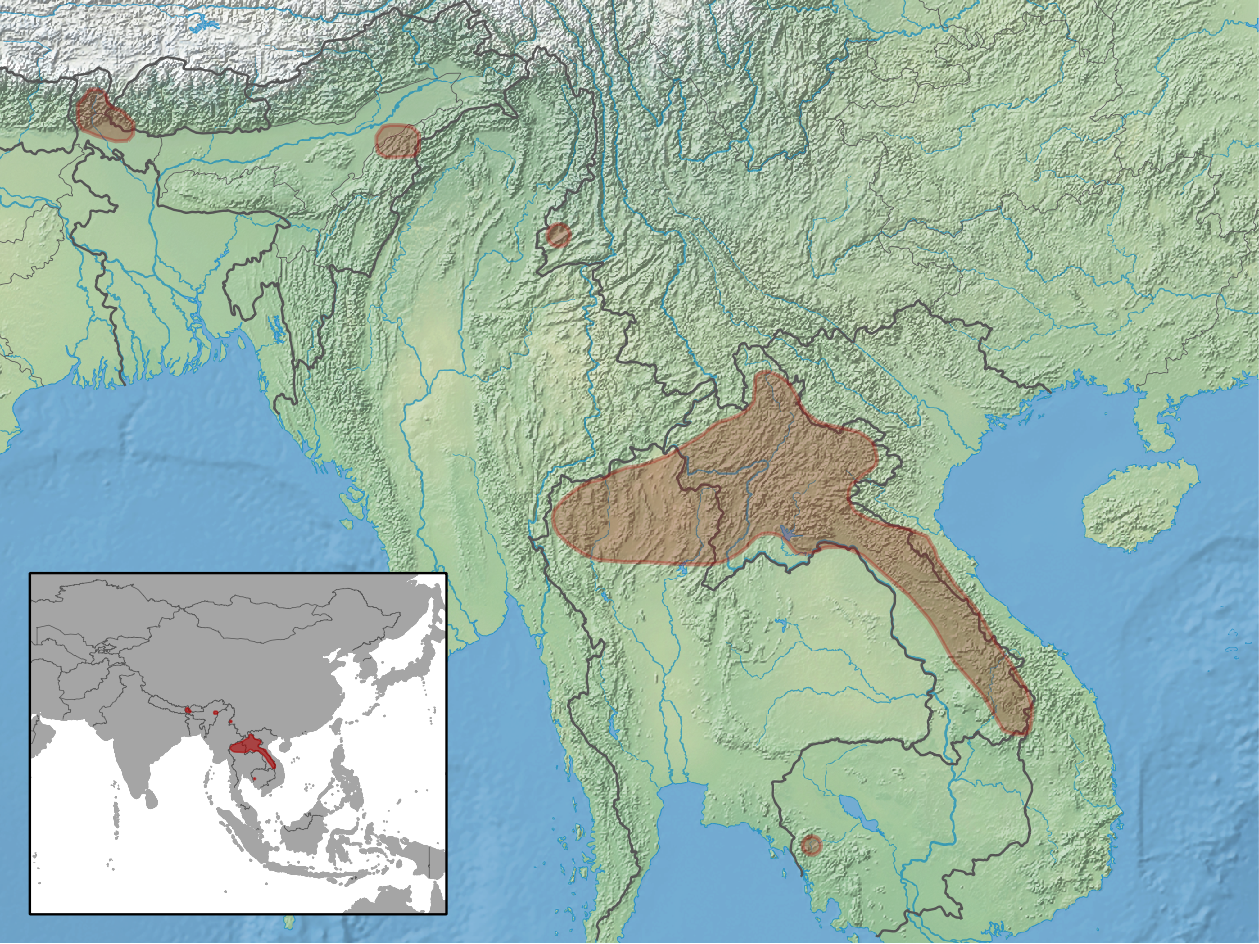

Species of bat

The hairy-faced bat (Myotis annectans) is a species of vesper bat.

It can be found in the following countries: Bangladesh, India, Indonesia, Laos, Myanmar, and Thailand.
