= Sturdee's pipistrelle =

Alionoctula sturdeei

Conservation status
- Extinct (1889) (IUCN 3.1)

Scientific classification
- Kingdom: Animalia
- Phylum: Chordata
- Class: Mammalia
- Infraclass: Placentalia
- Order: Chiroptera
- Family: Vespertilionidae
- Genus: Alionoctula
- Species: †A. sturdeei

Binomial name
- †Alionoctula sturdeei (Thomas, 1915)

Species of bat

Sturdee's pipistrelle (Alionoctula sturdeei), also known as the Japanese bat or Bonin pipistrelle, is an extinct species of bat that was endemic to Japan. The last time this bat was seen was in 1889. However, The sturdee's pipistrelle was declared extinct between 1996 and 2004.

== Description ==
Alionoctula sturdeei was thought to have existed solely on Haha-jima Island in the Bonin Islands, Japan, where the only known specimen was discovered. More recent scholarship, though, places doubt on the single specimen's origin and taxonomy. The previous population of this animal is unknown because only one specimen has been preserved, which is currently housed in the Natural History Museum, London. No record of Sturdee's pipistrelle has been observed since 1889.
