= Greater Papuan pipistrelle =

Conservation status
- Least Concern (IUCN 3.1)

Scientific classification
- Kingdom: Animalia
- Phylum: Chordata
- Class: Mammalia
- Infraclass: Placentalia
- Order: Chiroptera
- Family: Vespertilionidae
- Genus: Alionoctula
- Species: A. collina

Binomial name
- Alionoctula collina (Thomas, 1920)

Species of bat

The greater Papuan pipistrelle (Alionoctula collina) is a species of vesper bat found in Papua New Guinea and Irian Jaya.
