= Forest pipistrelle =

Conservation status
- Least Concern (IUCN 3.1)

Scientific classification
- Kingdom: Animalia
- Phylum: Chordata
- Class: Mammalia
- Infraclass: Placentalia
- Order: Chiroptera
- Family: Vespertilionidae
- Genus: Alionoctula
- Species: A. adamsi

Binomial name
- Alionoctula adamsi (Kitchener, Caputi & Jones, 1986)
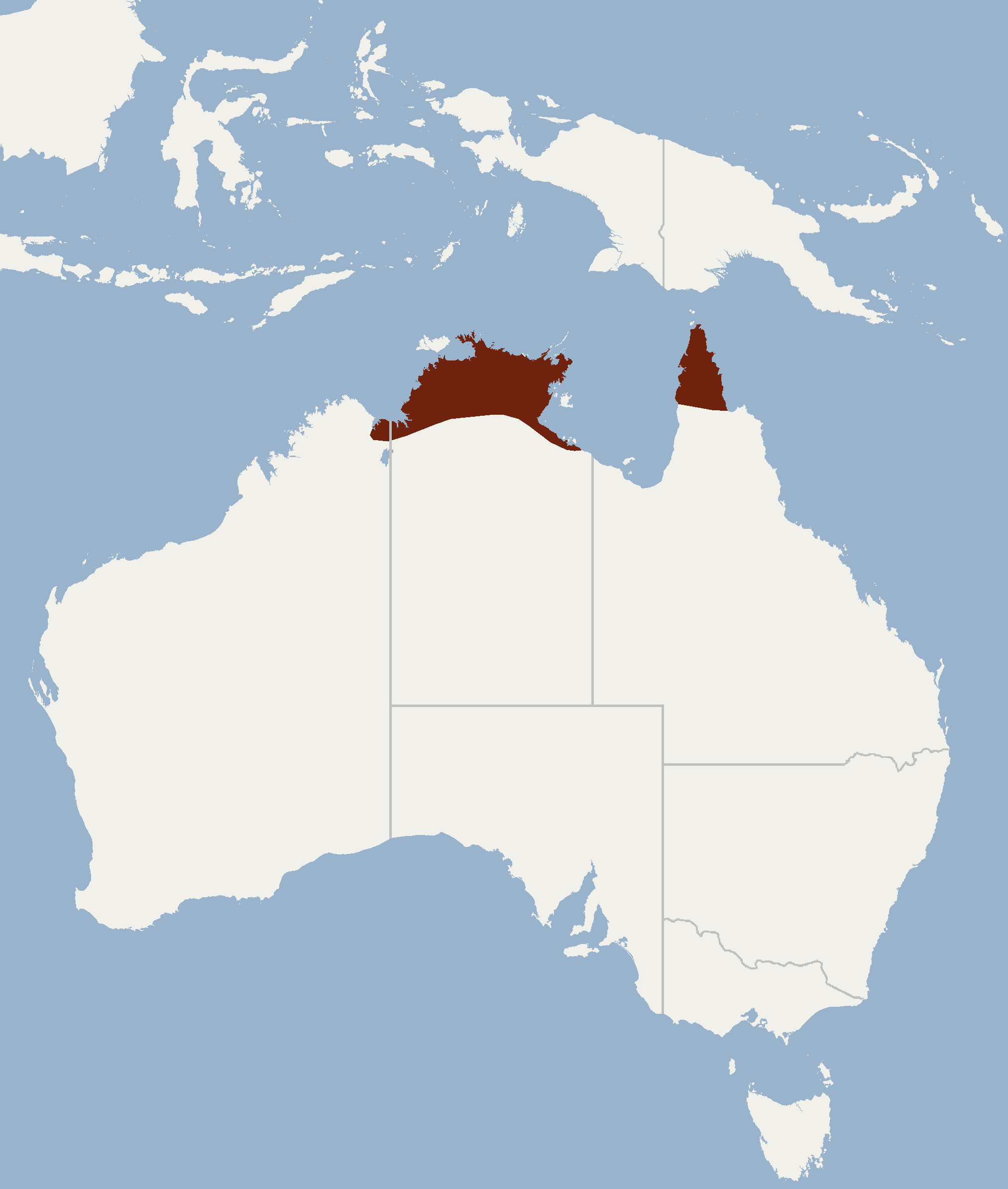

Species of bat

The forest pipistrelle (Alionoctula adamsi) is a species of vesper bat found in Australia, in the northernmost parts of Queensland and the Northern Territory.
