= Lesser Papuan pipistrelle =

Conservation status
- Least Concern (IUCN 3.1)

Scientific classification
- Kingdom: Animalia
- Phylum: Chordata
- Class: Mammalia
- Infraclass: Placentalia
- Order: Chiroptera
- Family: Vespertilionidae
- Genus: Alionoctula
- Species: A. papuana

Binomial name
- Alionoctula papuana (Peters & Doria, 1881)

Species of bat

The lesser Papuan pipistrelle (Alionoctula papuana) is a species of vesper bat. It can be found in Indonesia and Papua New Guinea.
