= Northern pipistrelle =

Conservation status
- Least Concern (IUCN 3.1)

Scientific classification
- Kingdom: Animalia
- Phylum: Chordata
- Class: Mammalia
- Infraclass: Placentalia
- Order: Chiroptera
- Family: Vespertilionidae
- Genus: Alionoctula
- Species: A. westralis

Binomial name
- Alionoctula westralis Koopman, 1984
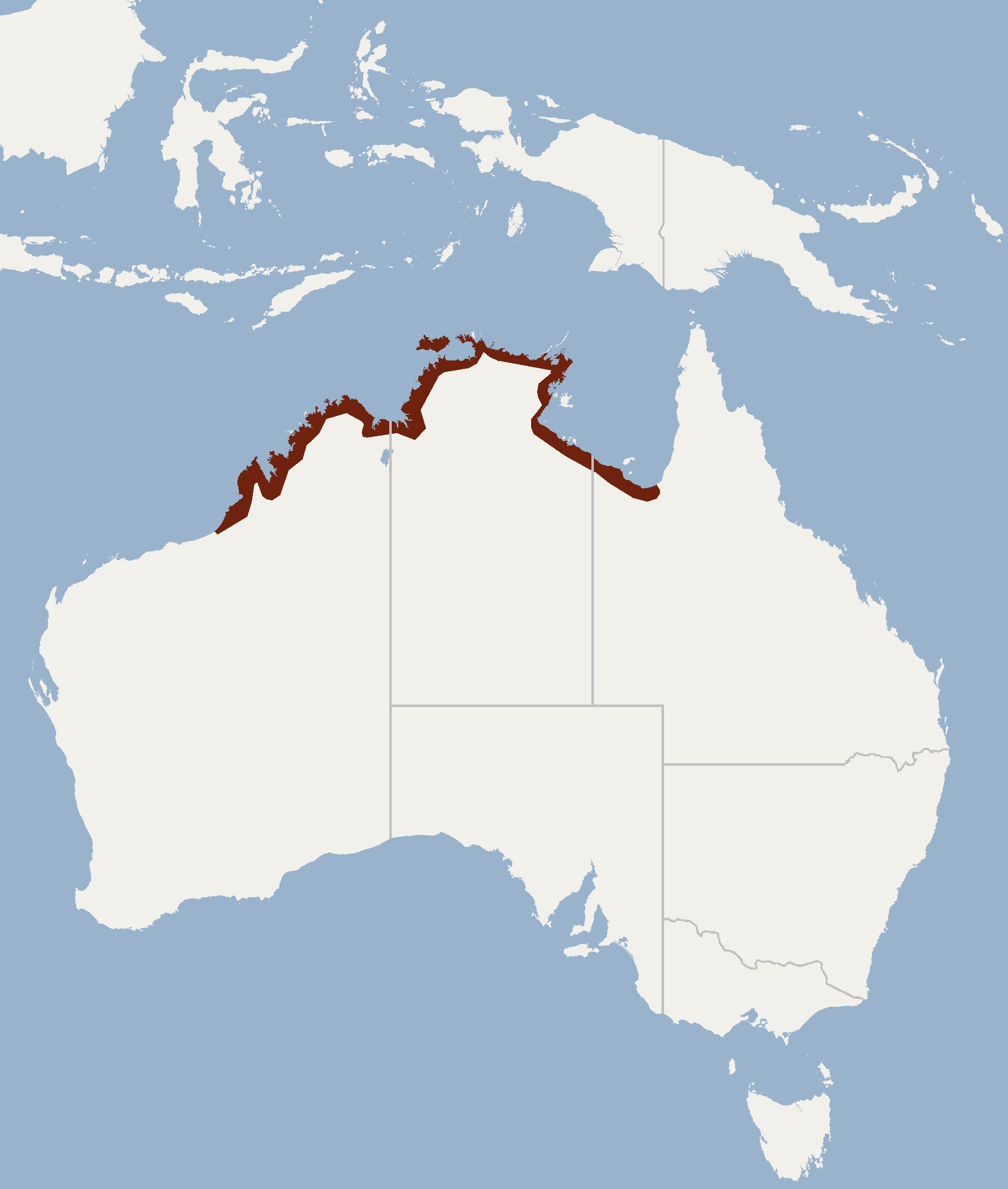

Species of bat

The northern pipistrelle (Alionoctula westralis), also known as Koopman's or the mangrove pipistrelle, is a species of vesper bat found only in Australia. It is one of Australia's smallest bat species. On average, it weighs 3 g (0.11 oz).

== Range and habitat ==
A. westralis thrives primarily in mangrove habitats, but it is also found in adjacent thickets and riverine forests. Its range is along the coasts of northern Western Australia, Northern Territory, and north western Queensland.

Although its habitat is limited, it is common across its range and its population seems to be stable. The only current major threat to the species is habitat loss. It is present in a number of protected areas including Kakadu and Keep River National Parks, and the Prince Regent Nature Reserve.
