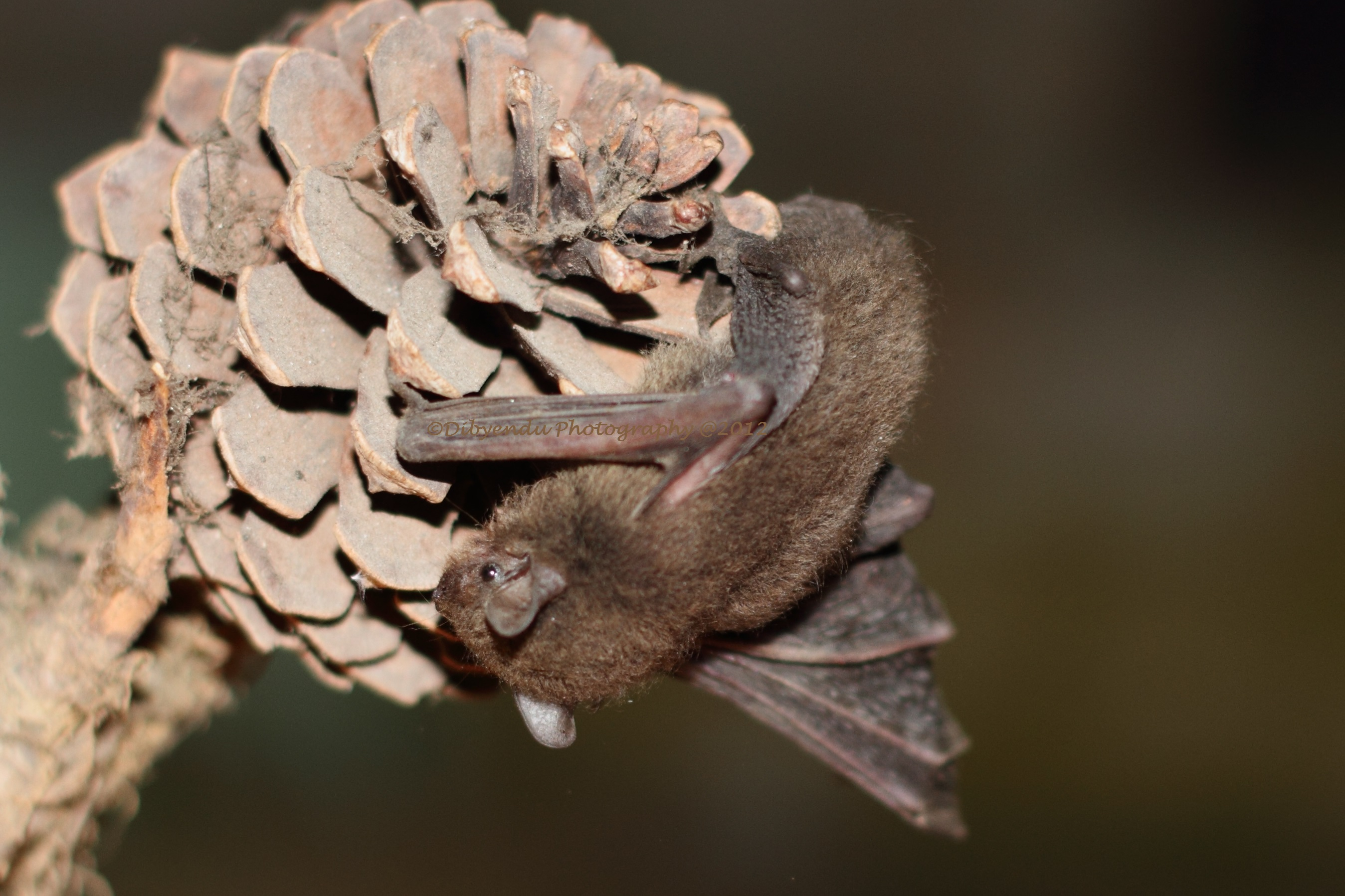

Conservation status
- Least Concern (IUCN 3.1)

Scientific classification
- Kingdom: Animalia
- Phylum: Chordata
- Class: Mammalia
- Infraclass: Placentalia
- Order: Chiroptera
- Family: Vespertilionidae
- Genus: Alionoctula
- Species: A. tenuis

Binomial name
- Alionoctula tenuis (Temminck, 1840)

= Least pipistrelle =

Species of bat

The least pipistrelle (Alionoctula tenuis) is a species of vesper bat.

== Distribution ==
The bat is native to South Asia, Southeast Asia, Maritime Southeast Asia, Malaysia , and southwestern Oceania. It has been recorded from sea level to 769 metres (2,523 ft) in elevation.

Countries and islands it can be found in include: Laos, southeastern China and Hainan island, the Philippines, Borneo, Indonesia, East Timor, Malaysia, Vietnam, Bangladesh, Sri Lanka, India, Nepal, Pakistan, and Afghanistan.

== Description ==
The head and body length of the least pipistrelle is 6–7 cm (2.4–2.8 in), the forearm measures 3 cm (1.2 in) and the wingspan is 18–24 cm (7.1–9.4 in). The bat weighs 6–8 g (0.21–0.28 oz). Females are larger than males. They are dark brown to black above, and lighter below. The wing membrane, face, and ears are black. with no pale margins like those of Indian pipistrelle. The muzzle is short and broad and the nostrils are small, rounded, and placed between facial swellings. The small ears have prominent tragi and antitragi. The fur is dense, short, silky, and covers the entire body.

== Subspecies ==
Subspecies include:

- Pipistrellus tenuis tenuis
- Pipistrellus tenuis mimus
- Pipistrellus tenuis murrayi
- Pipistrellus tenuis nitidus
- Pipistrellus tenuis ponceleti
- Pipistrellus tenuis portensis
- Pipistrellus tenuis sewelanus
- Pipistrellus tenuis subulidens
