= Mount Popa pipistrelle =

Conservation status
- Least Concern (IUCN 3.1)

Scientific classification
- Kingdom: Animalia
- Phylum: Chordata
- Class: Mammalia
- Infraclass: Placentalia
- Order: Chiroptera
- Family: Vespertilionidae
- Genus: Alionoctula
- Species: A. paterculus

Binomial name
- Alionoctula paterculus Thomas, 1915
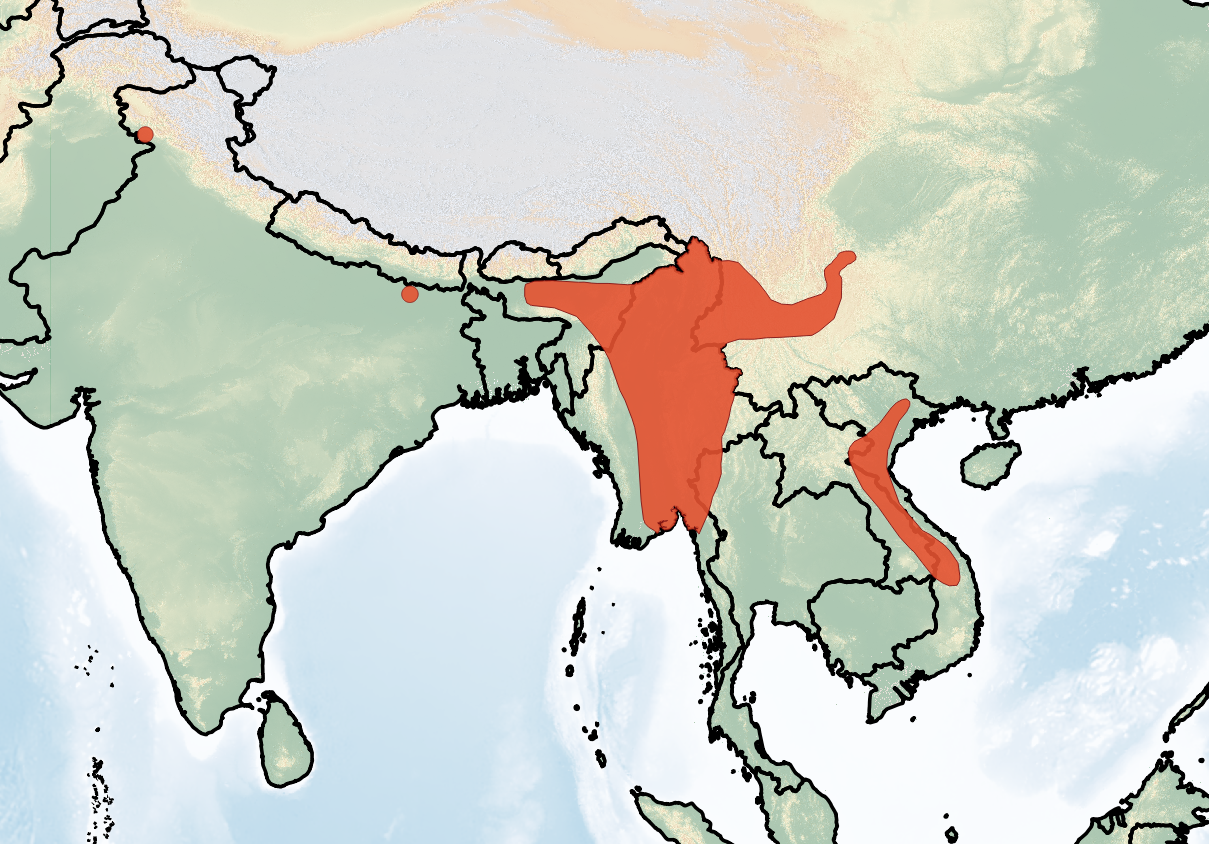

Species of bat

The Mount Popa pipistrelle (Alionoctula paterculus) is a species of vesper bat. It is found in China, India, Myanmar, Thailand, and Vietnam.
