= Kelaart's pipistrelle =

Conservation status
- Least Concern (IUCN 3.1)

Scientific classification
- Kingdom: Animalia
- Phylum: Chordata
- Class: Mammalia
- Order: Chiroptera
- Family: Vespertilionidae
- Genus: Alionoctula
- Species: A. ceylonica

Binomial name
- Alionoctula ceylonica (Kelaart, 1852)

Species of bat

Kelaart's pipistrelle (Alionoctula ceylonica) is a species of vesper bat found in southern and south-eastern Asia from Pakistan to Indonesia.

== Description ==
The head and body Kelaart's pipistrelle together measure 9 centimetres (3.5 in) in length. The forearms are 4 centimetres (1.6 in), the wingspan is 26–27 centimetres (10–11 in) and the bat weight 3–5 grams (0.11–0.18 oz). Males are larger and brighter than females. Color varies from almost dark brown to bright reddish brown, but usually reddish brown above and paler below. The wing membrane are dark brown and the body is covered with dense, short fur.
