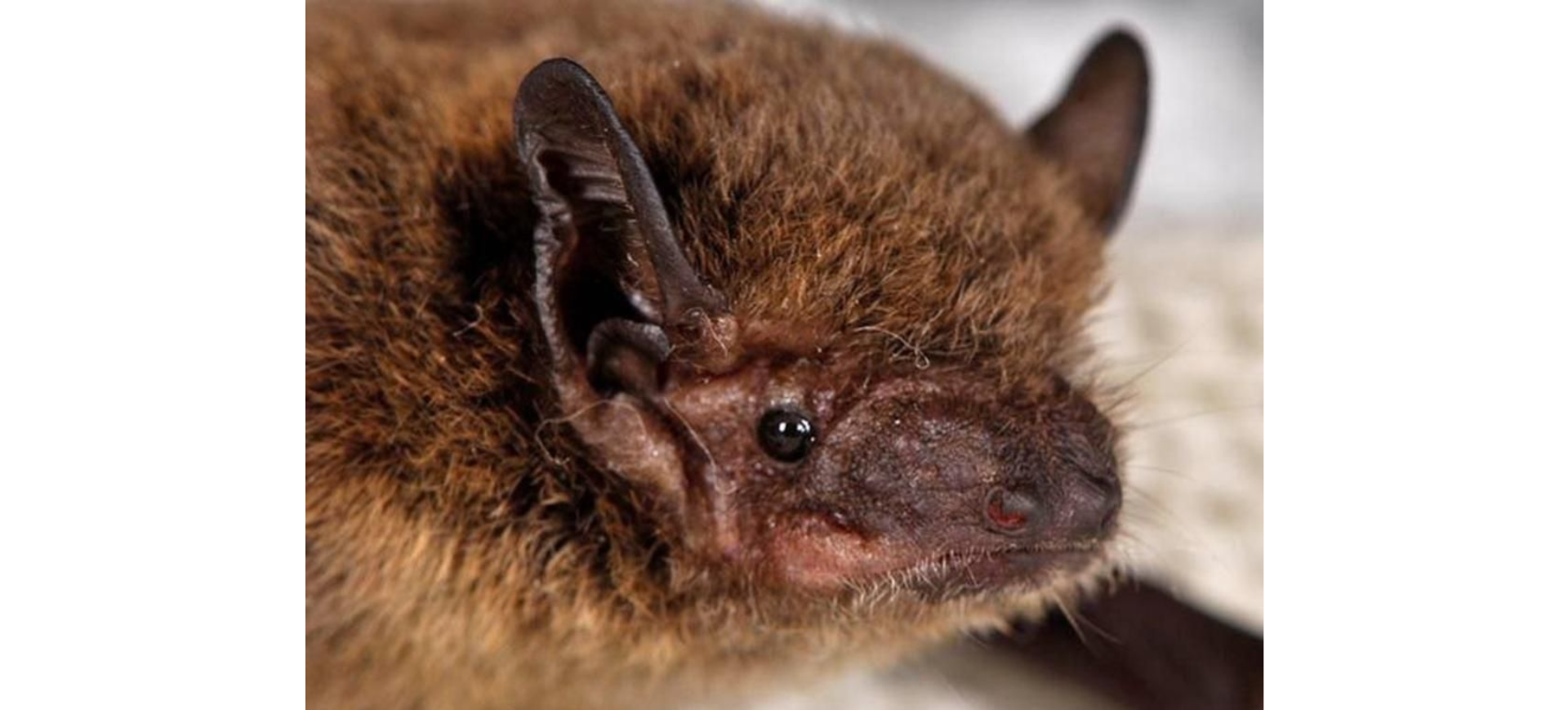

Conservation status
- Least Concern (IUCN 3.1)

Scientific classification
- Kingdom: Animalia
- Phylum: Chordata
- Class: Mammalia
- Order: Chiroptera
- Family: Vespertilionidae
- Genus: Alionoctula
- Species: A. javanica

Binomial name
- Alionoctula javanica (Gray, 1838)
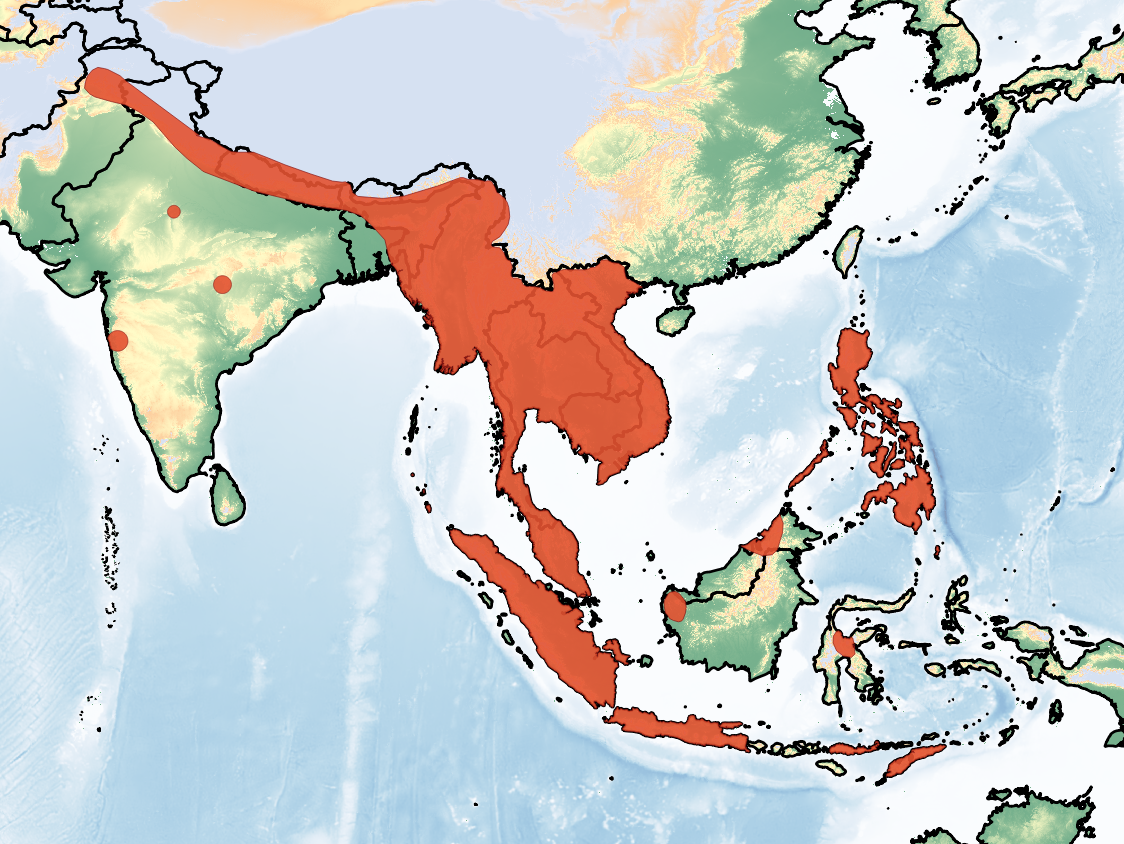

= Java pipistrelle =

Eastern pipistrelle

Species of bat

The Javan pipistrelle (Alionoctula javanica) is a species of pipistrelle bat found in South and Southeast Asia.

== Range and habitat ==
The Javan Pipistrelle lives throughout much of Afghanistan, Bangladesh, Brunei, Cambodia, China, India, Indonesia, Laos, Malaysia, Myanmar, Nepal, Pakistan, Philippines, Singapore, Thailand, and Vietnam.

== Relationship to humans ==
=== Human infrastructure ===
It favors human habitations, such as external crevices in old buildings, and culverts. Reports across cities suggest that they are adapted to living there despite the urban clutter. In urban areas, they are often found roosting individually or sparsely.

=== As possible disease reservoirs ===
A 2010 research paper from the Philippines regarding the prevalence of coronaviruses in bats tested several Java pipistrelle bats, but none of the tested samples gave a positive result.
