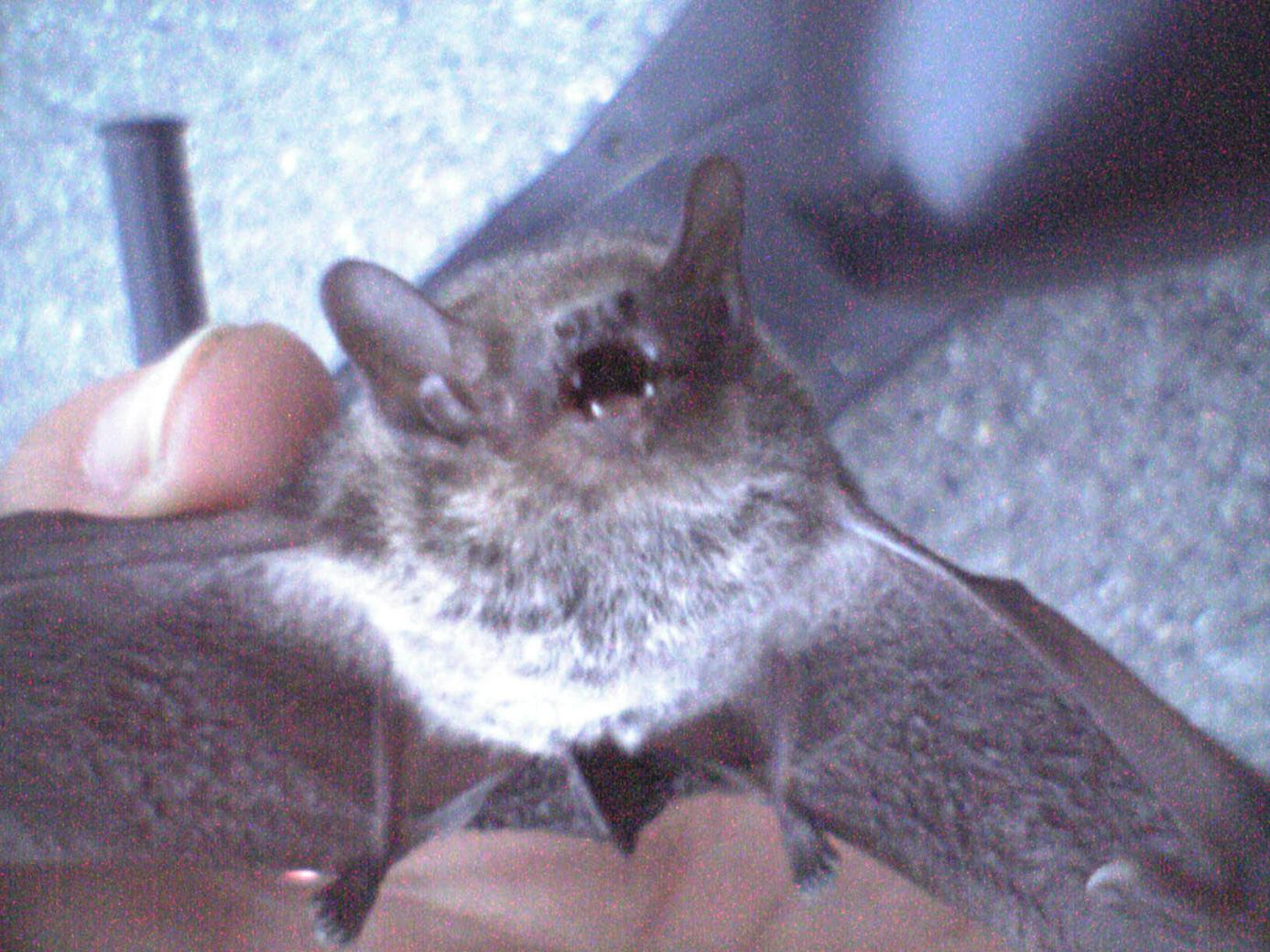

Conservation status
- Least Concern (IUCN 3.1)

Scientific classification
- Kingdom: Animalia
- Phylum: Chordata
- Class: Mammalia
- Infraclass: Placentalia
- Order: Chiroptera
- Family: Vespertilionidae
- Genus: Alionoctula
- Species: A. abramus

Binomial name
- Alionoctula abramus (Temminck, 1840)
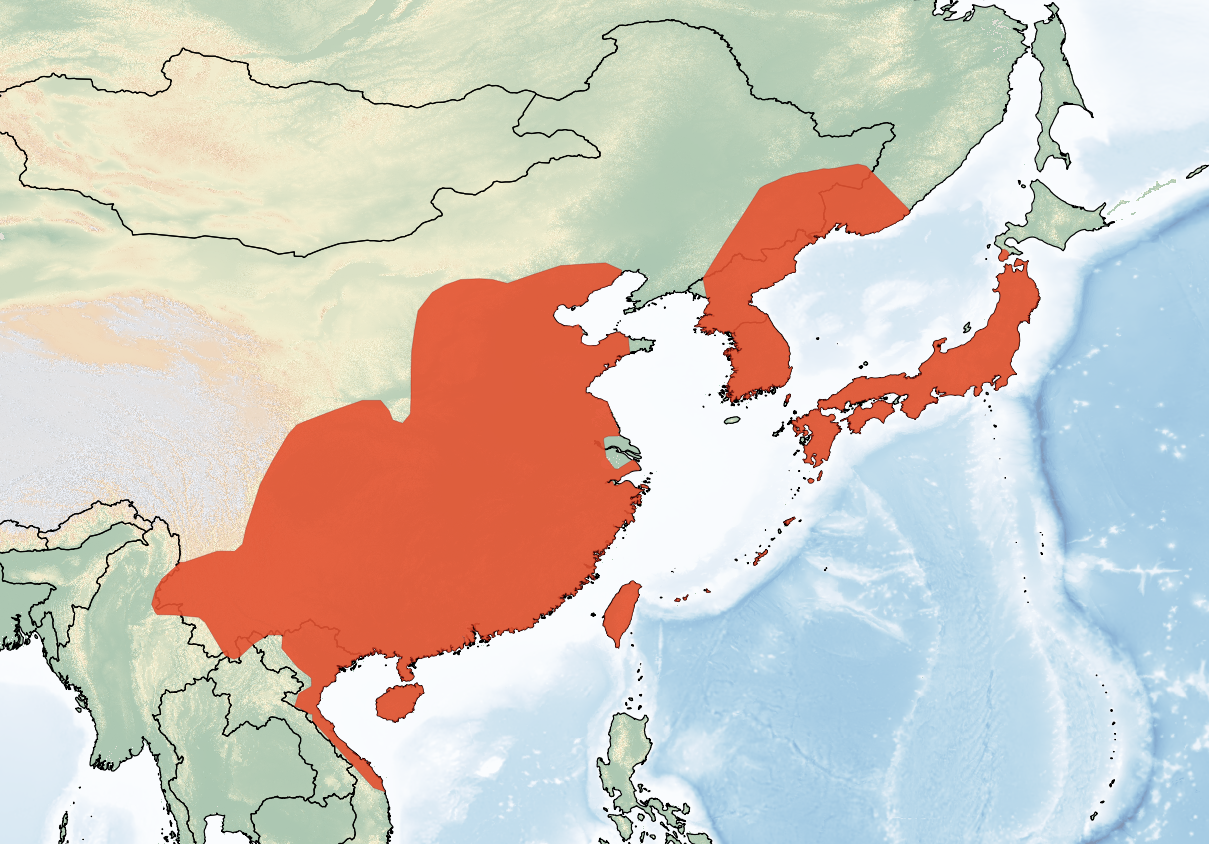

= Japanese pipistrelle =

Species of bat

The Japanese pipistrelle (Alionoctula abramus), also known as Japanese house bat, is a species of vesper bat. An adult has a body length of 3.6–4.8 cm (1.4–1.9 in), a tail of 2.9–4.0 cm (1.1–1.6 in), and a wing length of 3.2–3.6 cm (1.3–1.4 in). It prefers to roost under the ceiling or inside the roof of old buildings. It is found across East Asia, from China and Taiwan into the Ussuri region, the Korean Peninsula, and Japan.

== Further distribution ==
In China, it is found in Hainan province and its island and the Zhoushan archipelago.

== Diet ==
The species feeds on beetles, caddisflies, flies, hymenopterans, moths, and true bugs.

== Reproduction ==
Before the young is born, it goes through 33 embryonic stages.

== See also ==
- List of mammals in Hong Kong
- List of mammals in Korea
- List of mammals in Taiwan
- List of mammals in Japan
