= Indian pipistrelle =

Conservation status
- Least Concern (IUCN 3.1)

Scientific classification
- Kingdom: Animalia
- Phylum: Chordata
- Class: Mammalia
- Infraclass: Placentalia
- Order: Chiroptera
- Family: Vespertilionidae
- Genus: Alionoctula
- Species: A. coromandra

Binomial name
- Alionoctula coromandra (Gray, 1838)
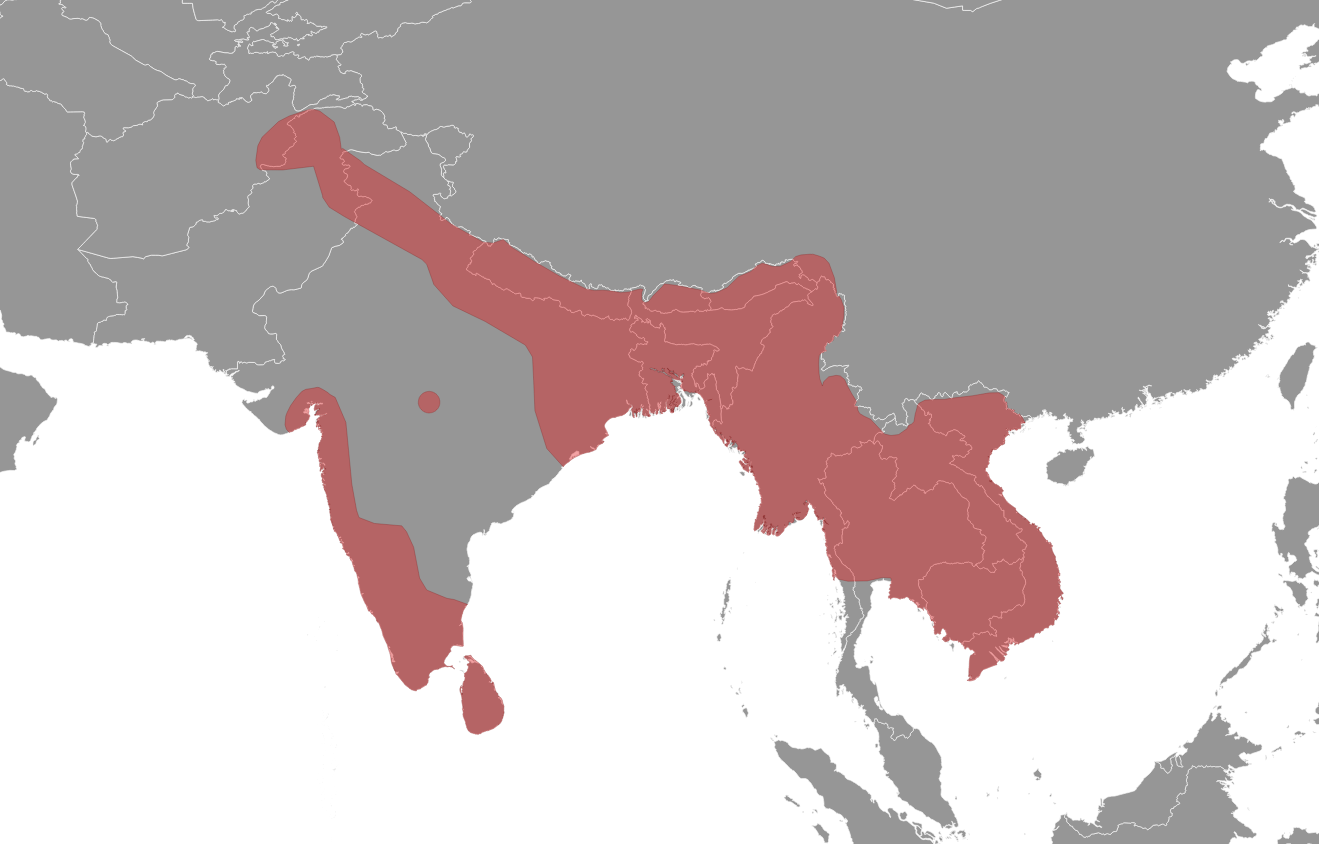

Species of bat

The Indian pipistrelle (Alionoctula coromandra) is a species of bat in the family Vespertilionidae found in Afghanistan, Bangladesh, Bhutan, Cambodia, India, Myanmar, Nepal, Pakistan, Sri Lanka, Thailand, and Vietnam.
