= Avivore =

Animal that preys on and eats birds

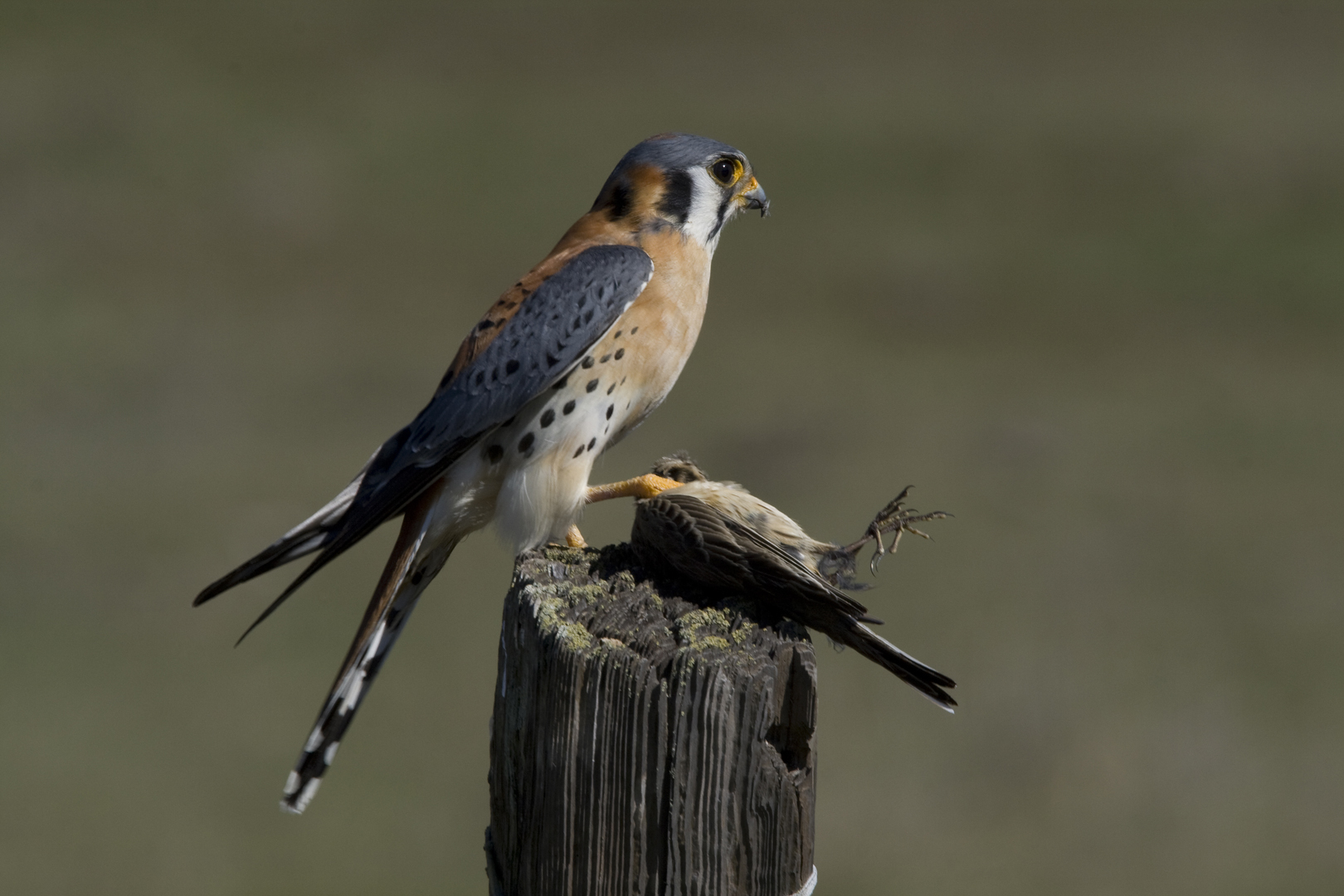
An American kestrel eating an American pipit

An avivore is a specialized predator of birds, with birds making up a large proportion of its diet. Such bird-eating animals come from a range of groups.

== Birds ==
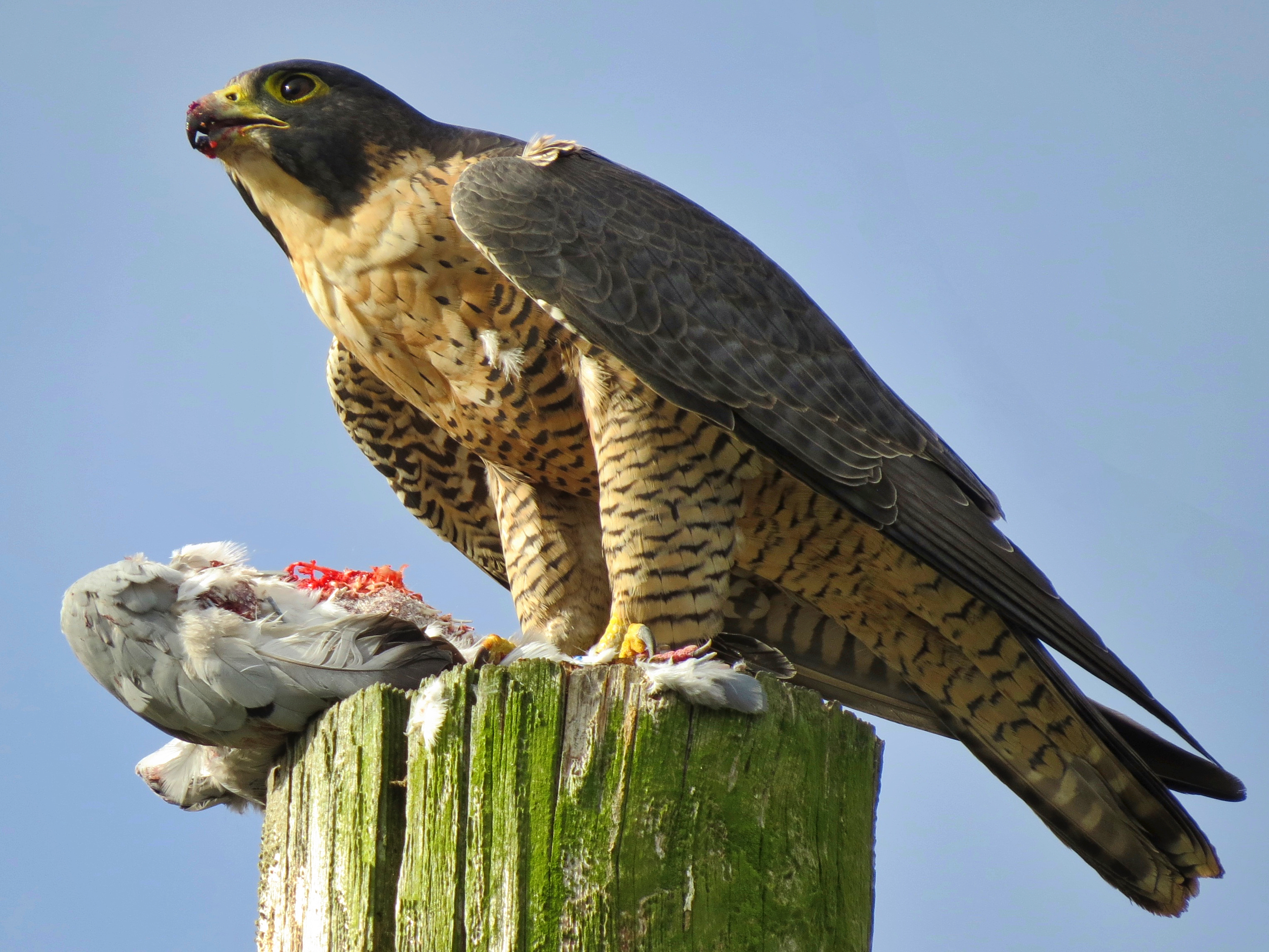
Peregrine falcons (Falco peregrinus) commonly eat birds, pictured here eating a rock dove (Columba livia)

Birds that are specialized predators of other birds include certain falcons and accipiters. General features of avian avivores include a skull form which is well adapted for grasping and crushing with the beak, although not especially well structured for neck twisting motions. Bird-eating raptors also tend to show greater sexual dimorphism than other raptors, with the females being larger than the males.

Some avian avivores such as the shikra, besra, Eurasian sparrowhawk, and sharp-shinned hawk catch their prey by flying from cover in a tree or bush, taking their prey unawares. In contrast, the lanner falcon hunts in open country taking birds by horizontal pursuit. The aplomado falcon will use both ambush and more extended flights. The peregrine falcon dives on flying birds from a great height at speeds that can exceed 300 km/h.

The extinct Haast's eagle of New Zealand preyed on the large flightless bird species of the region such as the moa.

== Mammals ==
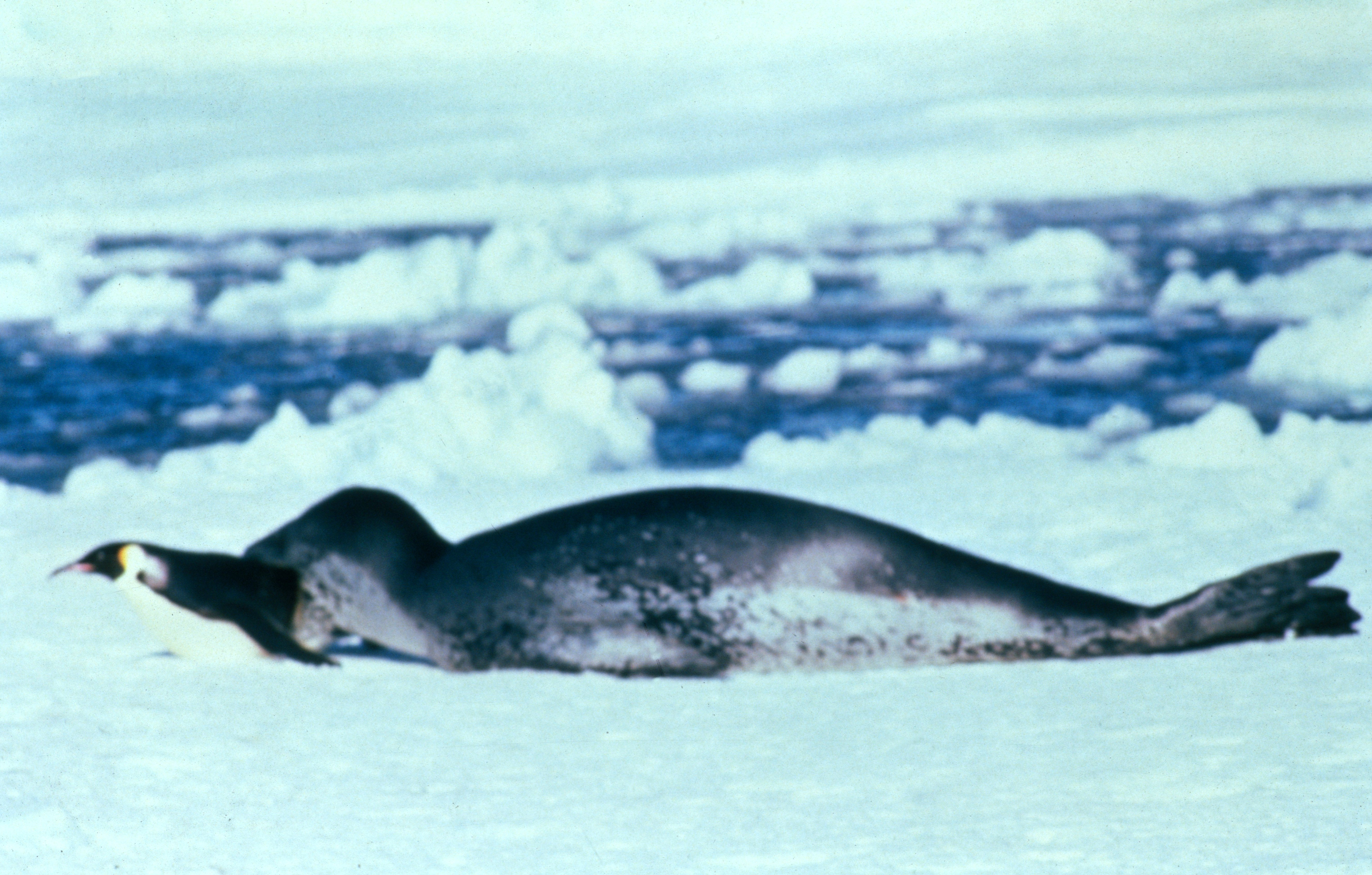
Leopard seal capturing an emperor penguin

In certain biotopes, birds constitute the bulk of the diet of various carnivorans, e.g., of adult leopard seals that mostly prey on penguins, the Arctic fox living in coastal areas where colonies of murres, auks, gulls, and other seabirds abound and stoats in New Zealand against whom flightless birds like the takahē and kiwi are defenseless. Other avivore mammals who occasionally prey on birds include most carnivora; a number of primates ranging from lorises and night monkeys over baboons and chimpanzees to humans; orcas; opossums and other marsupials; rats and other rodents; hedgehogs and other insectivora and bats.

A number of mammal species are specialized predators of birds. The caracal and the serval, both medium-sized cats, are known for their leaping ability which they use to catch flying birds, sometimes two at a time. Domestic cats may at times become specialists as bird-killers if other prey is unavailable. Some carnivora, including the red fox and martens, are known for engaging in surplus killing of birds. Kruuk (1972) observed that four red foxes killed 230 black-headed gulls in one night in a single colony at the Cumberland coast while fewer than 3% of the gulls showed any sign of being eaten. The greater noctule bat is believed to predate small migrating birds on the wing in the skies of Southern Europe.

Many mammals, such as squirrels, monkeys, and pine martens, also feed on bird eggs and young when they get the chance.

== Amphibians ==
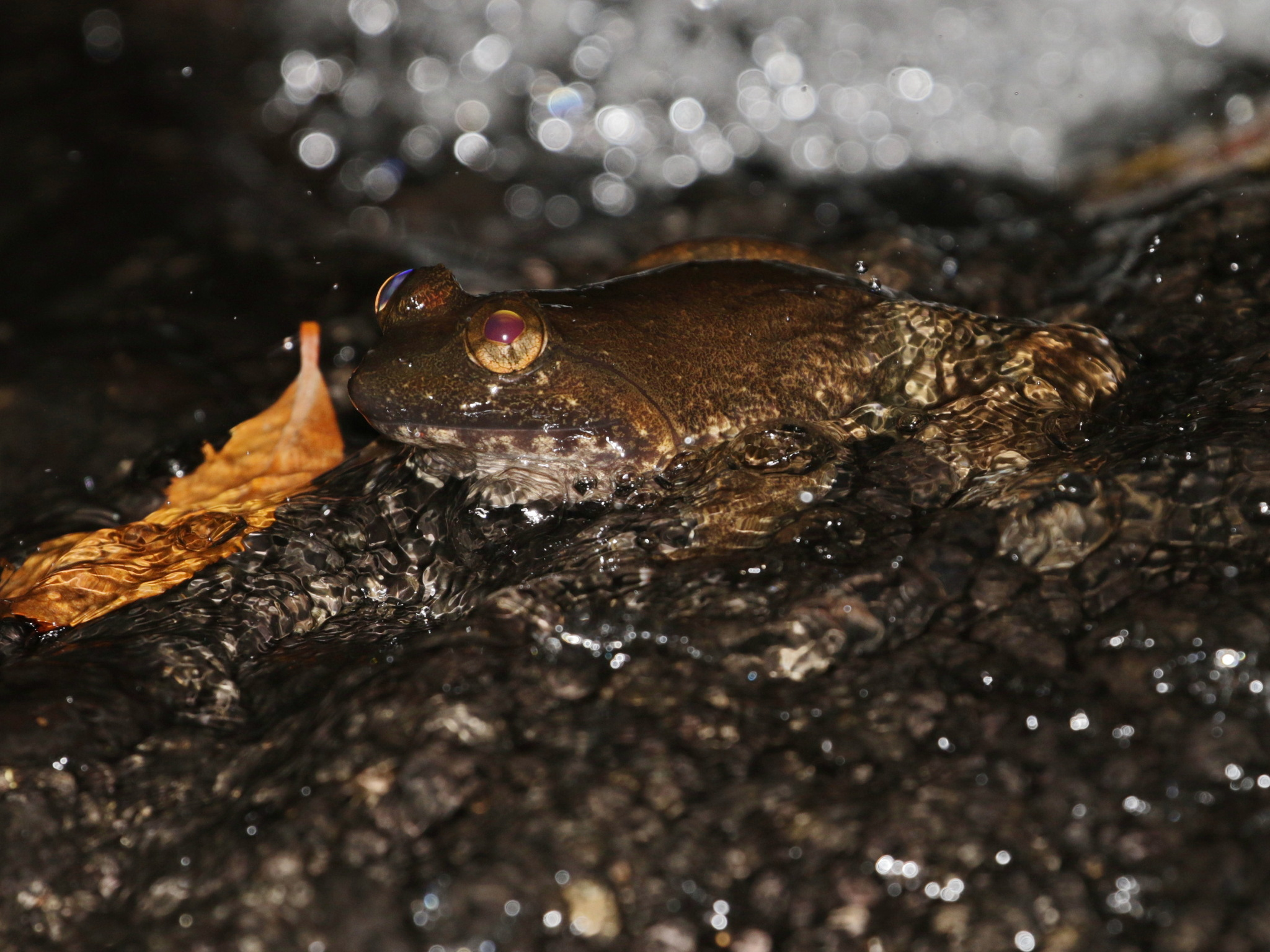
Limnonectes megastomias, a fanged frog reported to eat birds.

The fanged frog species Limnonectes megastomias preys on birds and insects.

== Arthropoda ==
Various groups of arthropod have been observed to be avivorous, however birds do not make up the majority of the diets of any arthropod; a strict avivore among the arthropods has not been discovered.

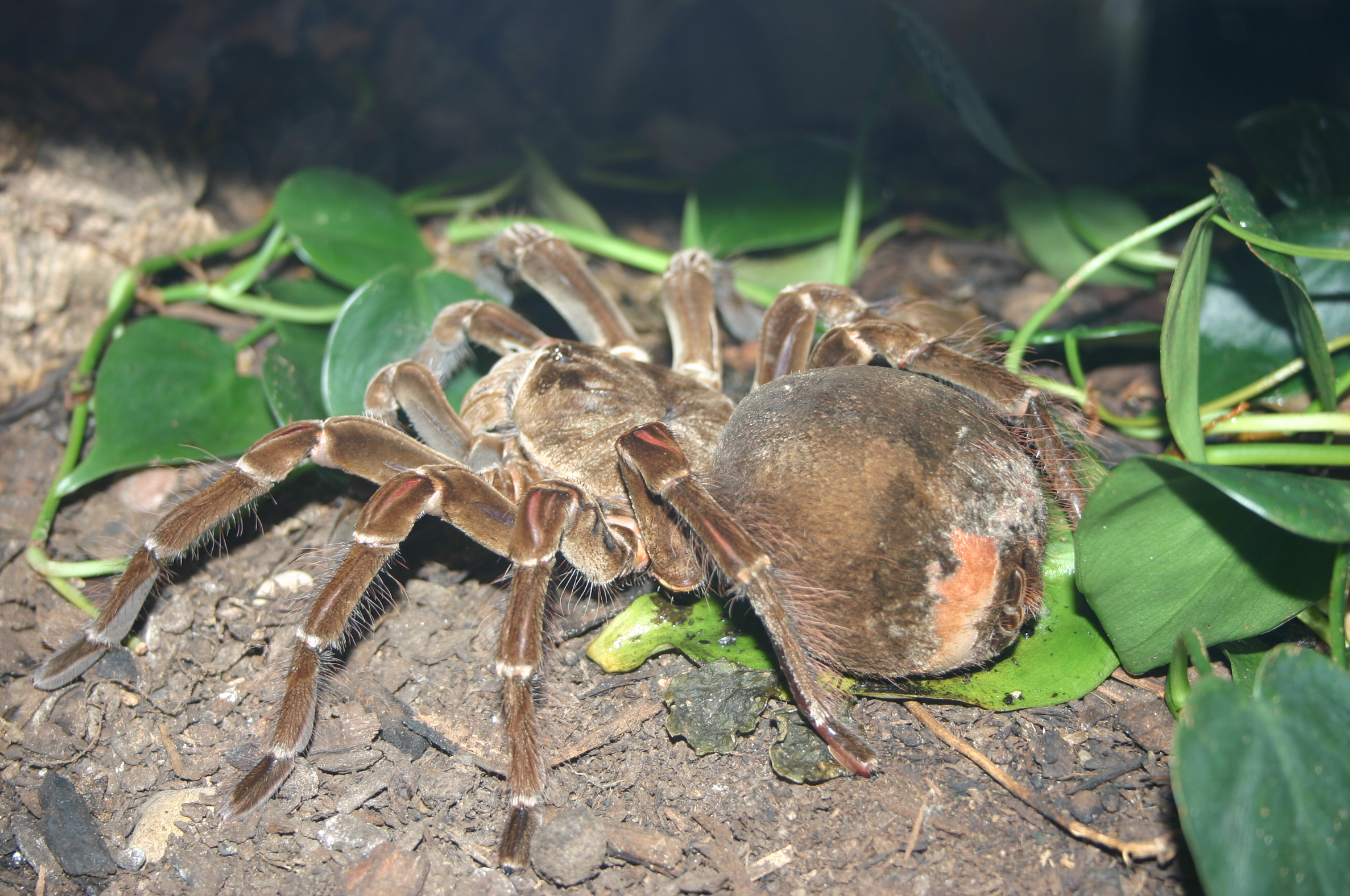
Goliath birdeater

The Goliath birdeater (Theraphosa blondi) is reputed to be an avivore (hence the name), but it rarely preys on birds. However, other species of spider have been observed to consume birds that they capture; large orb-weaving spiders, such as the golden orbweavers, have been observed to consume small birds such as mannikin and other finches. An Avicularia, another species of tarantula, has also been recorded to consume a bird.

The Phillip island centipede (Cormocephalus coynei) has been dubbed as a "giant bird-eating centipede"; it may consume petrel chicks (Pterodroma nigripennis) at a rate between ~2100 and ~3730 nestlings per year, across the island's population of centipedes. It has been theorized that the centipede was able to enter this ecological niche due to the absence of endemic mammalian predators on the island.

Praying mantises (Mantodea) are well documented in catching and consuming hummingbirds of a similar mass; the ruby-throated hummingbird is often preyed upon. In addition, other types of birds also fall prey to mantises, such as warblers, sunbirds, honeyeaters, flycatchers, vireos, and european robins.

Avivorous mantid genera include:

- Coptopteryx
- Hierodula
- Mantis
- Miomantis
- Polyspilota
- Sphodromantis
- Stagmatoptera
- Stagmomantis
- Tenodera

A coconut crab (Birgus latro) was filmed ambushing a sleeping red-footed booby, shattering wing bones on both wings with its claws, and consuming it along with 5 other coconut crabs, which were perhaps attracted by the commotion and scent of blood.
