= Polyspilota griffinii =

Scientific classification
- Kingdom: Animalia
- Phylum: Arthropoda
- Class: Insecta
- Order: Mantodea
- Family: Mantidae
- Genus: Polyspilota
- Species: P. griffinii

Binomial name
- Polyspilota griffinii Giglio-Tos, 1911

Species of praying mantis

Polyspilota griffinii, the Griffin mantis or Griffin's Mantis, is a species of praying mantis native to Cameroon that grows to about 5 inches in length.

== See also ==
- List of mantis genera and species
