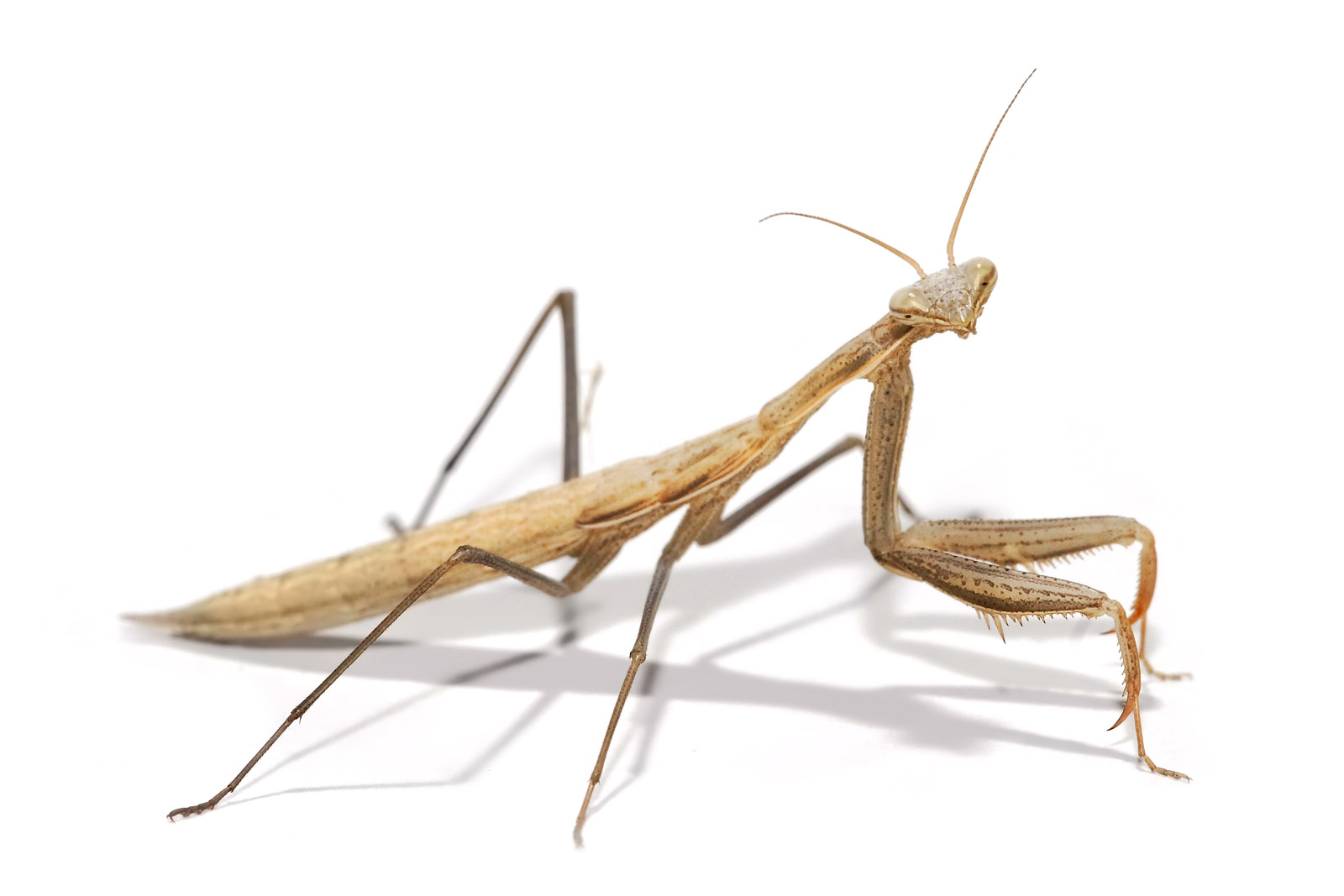
- Nymph

Scientific classification
- Kingdom: Animalia
- Phylum: Arthropoda
- Clade: Pancrustacea
- Class: Insecta
- Order: Mantodea
- Family: Mantidae
- Genus: Mantis
- Species: M. octospilota

Binomial name
- Mantis octospilota Westwood, 1889

= Mantis octospilota =

Species of praying mantis

Mantis octospilota, common name eight-spotted mantis or blackbarred mantis, is a species of praying mantis found in Australia. As its common name suggests, it is primarily identified by the eight black spots along the dorsal surface of its abdomen.

== Description ==
The Eight-spot Mantis is very similar in appearance to The European Mantis (Mantis religiosa). Their body measures over two inches in length as adults and have a short thorax, long wings, and a black spot on their inner forelegs, along with several smaller white spots below it. Adults have eight black spots on their abdomen, giving them their name. This is usually concealed by their wings. Their body is densely maculated with small spots that are barely visible.

== See also ==
- List of mantis genera and species
