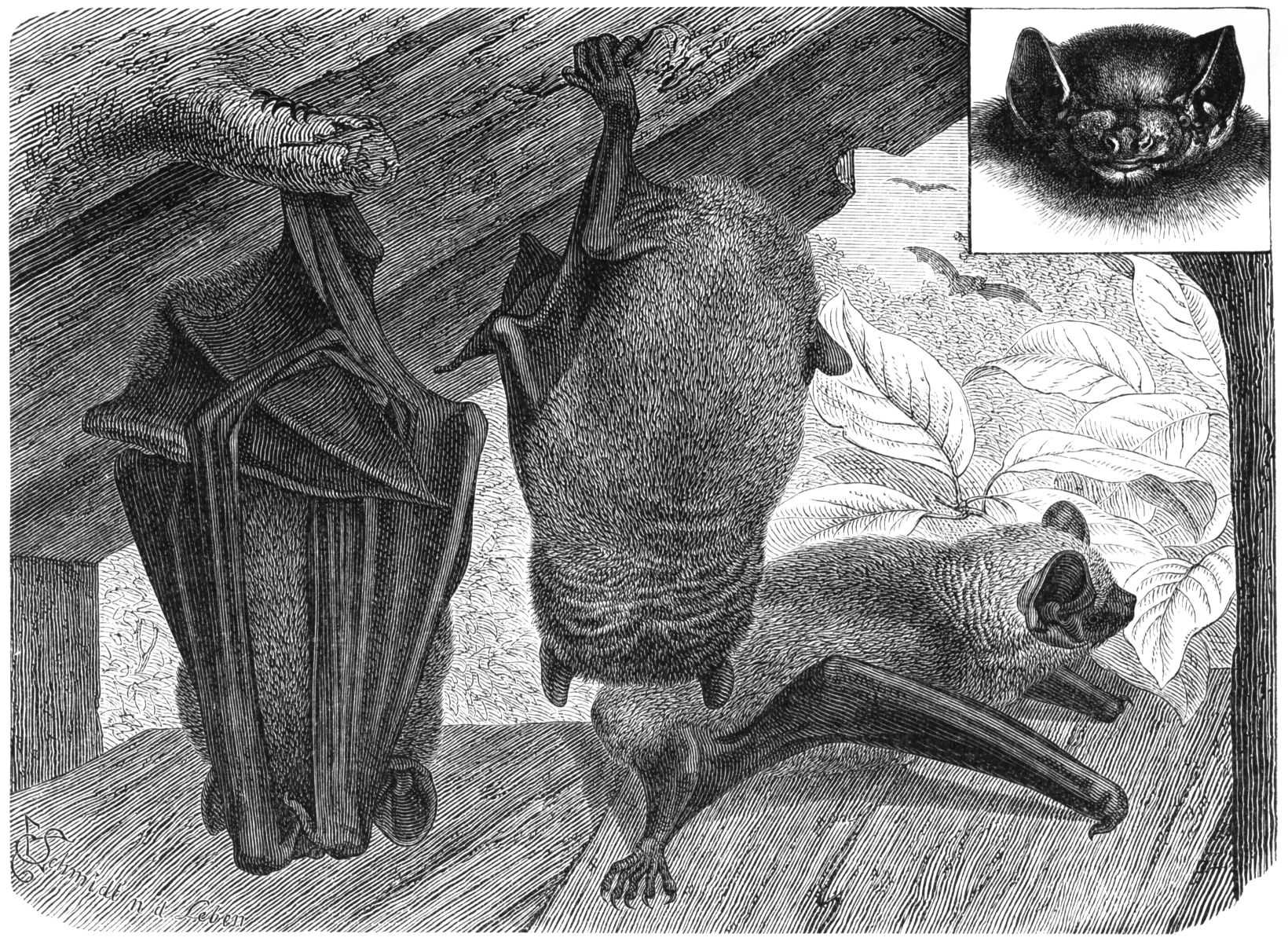

Scientific classification
- Domain: Eukaryota
- Kingdom: Animalia
- Phylum: Chordata
- Class: Mammalia
- Order: Chiroptera
- Family: Vespertilionidae
- Tribe: Pipistrellini
- Genus: Nyctalus; Bowdich, 1825

Type species
- Nyctalus verrucosus

Species
- See text

= Nyctalus =

Genus of bats

Nyctalus is a genus of vespertilionid bats commonly known as the noctule bats. They are distributed in the temperate and subtropical areas of Europe, Asia and North Africa.

There are eight species within this genus:

- Birdlike noctule, Nyctalus aviator
- Azores noctule, Nyctalus azoreum
- Japanese noctule, Nyctalus furvus
- Greater noctule bat, Nyctalus lasiopterus
- Lesser noctule, Nyctalus leisleri
- Mountain noctule, Nyctalus montanus
- Common noctule, Nyctalus noctula
- Chinese noctule, Nyctalus plancyi

== See also ==
- Microbat
- Yangochiroptera
