= Mountain noctule =

Conservation status
- Least Concern (IUCN 3.1)

Scientific classification
- Kingdom: Animalia
- Phylum: Chordata
- Class: Mammalia
- Order: Chiroptera
- Family: Vespertilionidae
- Genus: Nyctalus
- Species: N. montanus

Binomial name
- Nyctalus montanus Barrett-Hamilton, 1906

Species of bat

The mountain noctule (Nyctalus montanus) is a species of bat found in Afghanistan, India, Pakistan, and Nepal.
