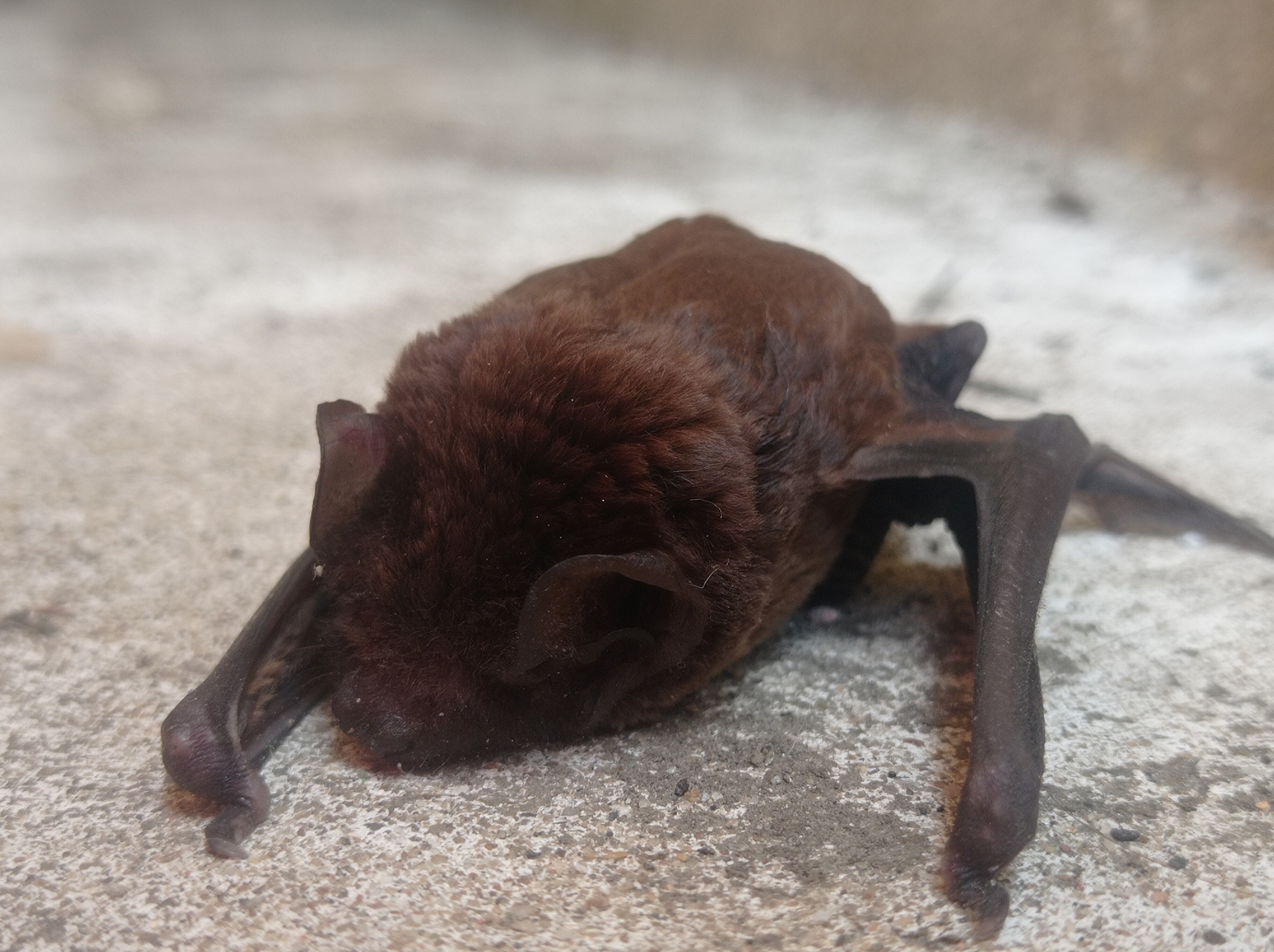

Conservation status
- Least Concern (IUCN 3.1)

Scientific classification
- Kingdom: Animalia
- Phylum: Chordata
- Class: Mammalia
- Order: Chiroptera
- Family: Vespertilionidae
- Genus: Nyctalus
- Species: N. plancyi

Binomial name
- Nyctalus plancyi Gerbe, 1880

Subspecies
- N. p. plancyi N. p. velutinus
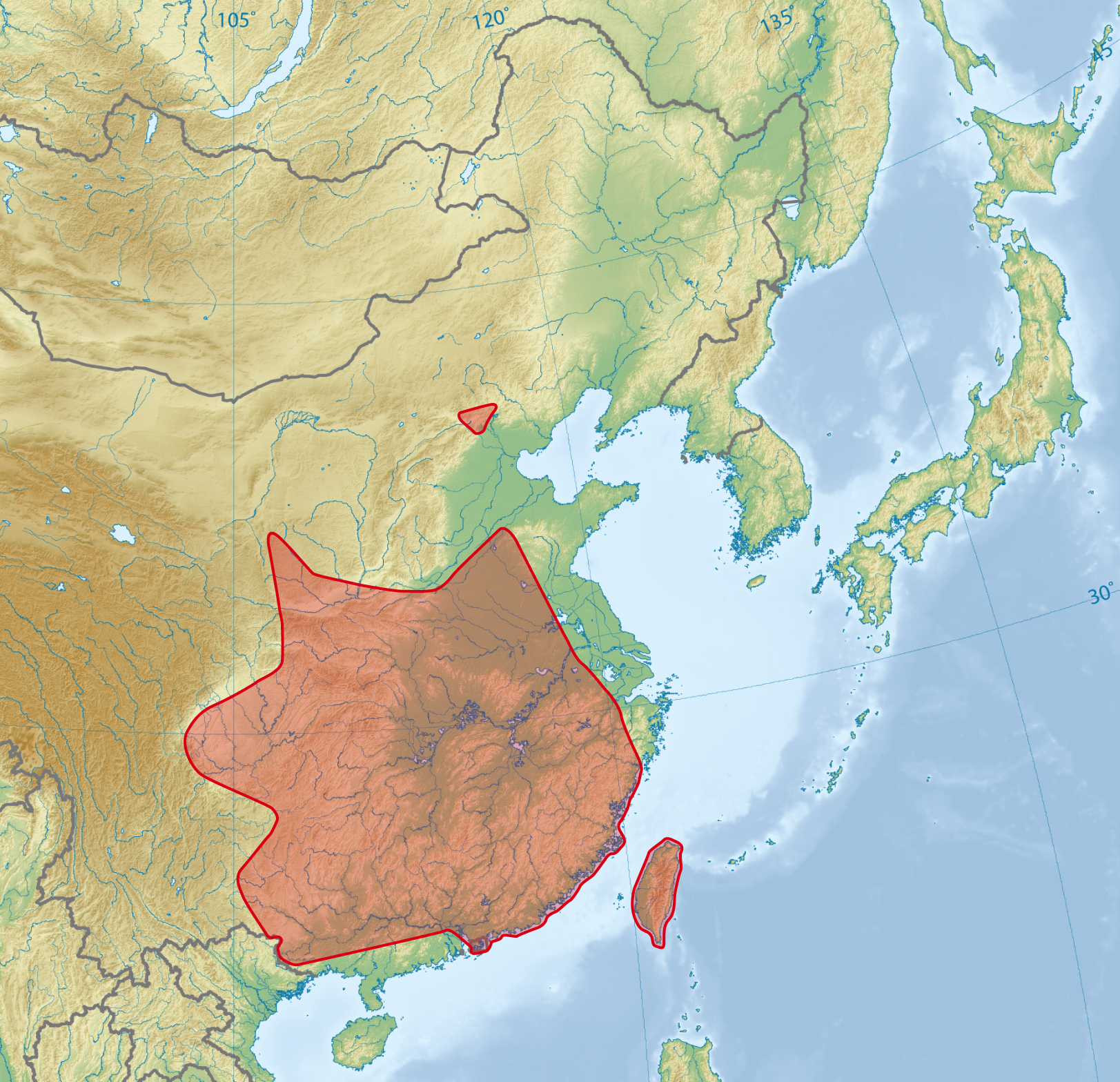
- Distribution map of the Chinese Noctule

= Chinese noctule =

Species of bat

The Chinese noctule (Nyctalus plancyi) is a common and widespread species of bat belonging to the family Vespertilionidae.

== Distribution and habitat ==
The Chinese noctule is found in China and Taiwan. They typically inhabit forests, but also commonly appear within rural communities. The bats are often found roosting under buildings, hollow trees, ruins, caves, and rock crevices.

== Description ==
The Chinese noctule are distinguished by their golden brown fur. The length of their forearm averages to about 49 to 53 mm (1.9 to 2.1 in) and the bat weighs around 21 to 26 grams (0.74 to 0.92 oz).
