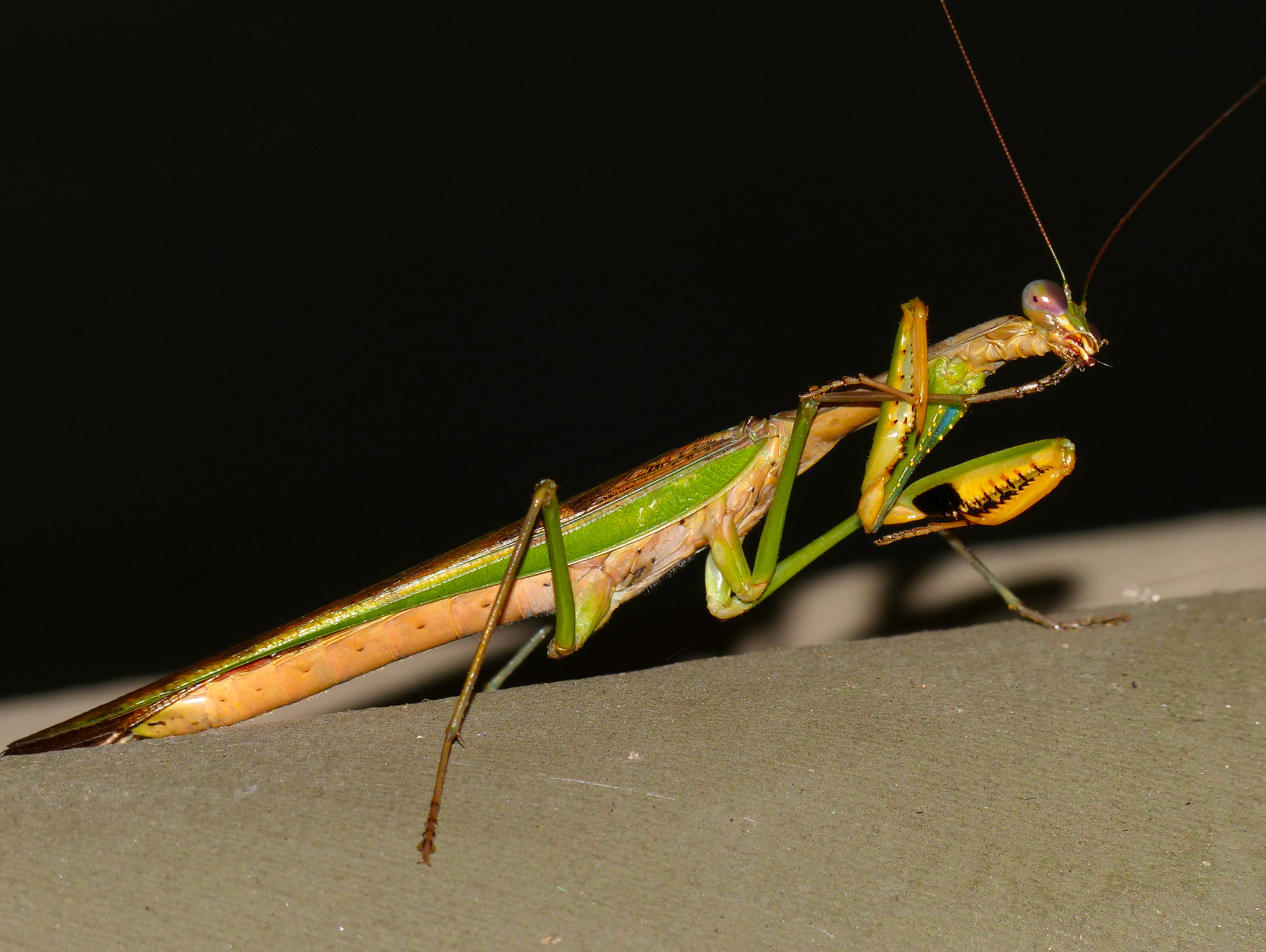

Scientific classification
- Kingdom: Animalia
- Phylum: Arthropoda
- Clade: Pancrustacea
- Class: Insecta
- Order: Mantodea
- Family: Mantidae
- Genus: Polyspilota
- Species: P. aeruginosa

Binomial name
- Polyspilota aeruginosa (Goeze, 1778)

Synonyms
- Mantis variegata

= Polyspilota aeruginosa =

Species of praying mantis

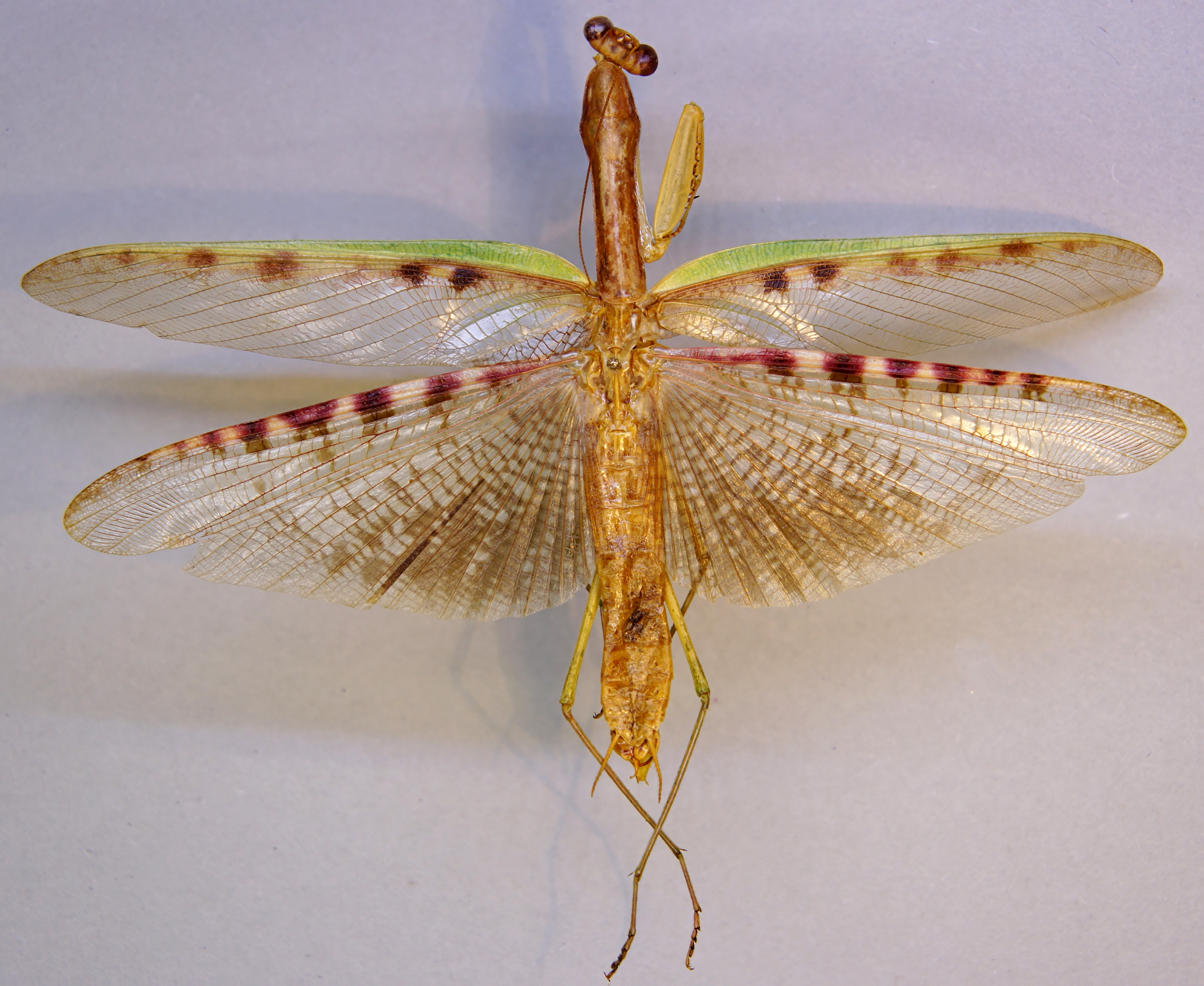
Polyspilota aeruginosa from Zoologische Staatssammlung München

Polyspilota aeruginosa, common name Madagascan marbled mantis, is a species of praying mantis native to Africa. Adult females reach 8 centimetres (3.1 in) in length while males are smaller around 6 to 7 cm.

== See also ==
- List of mantis genera and species
