= Cormocephalus coynei =

Phillip Island centipede

Scientific classification
- Kingdom: Animalia
- Phylum: Arthropoda
- Subphylum: Myriapoda
- Class: Chilopoda
- Order: Scolopendromorpha
- Family: Scolopendridae
- Genus: Cormocephalus
- Species: C. coynei

Binomial name
- Cormocephalus coynei L. E. Koch, 1984

Species of centipede

Cormocephalus coynei is a species of centipede found on the uninhabited Phillip and Nepean islands to the south of Norfolk Island. It is also known as the Phillip Island centipede. The species was observed on Phillip Island in 1792, but was not formally described until 1984. It can grow up to 23.5 cm, and is reddish brown and orange in colour. The Phillip Island centipede is known for its habit of preying on vertebrates including geckos, skinks, black-winged petrel (Pterodroma nigripennis) nestlings, and fish, as well as other small arthropods. The centipede may consume petrel chicks at a rate between ~2100 and ~3730 nestlings per year, across the island's population of centipedes. It is theorized that the centipede was able to enter this ecological niche due to the absence of endemic mammalian predators on the island.
