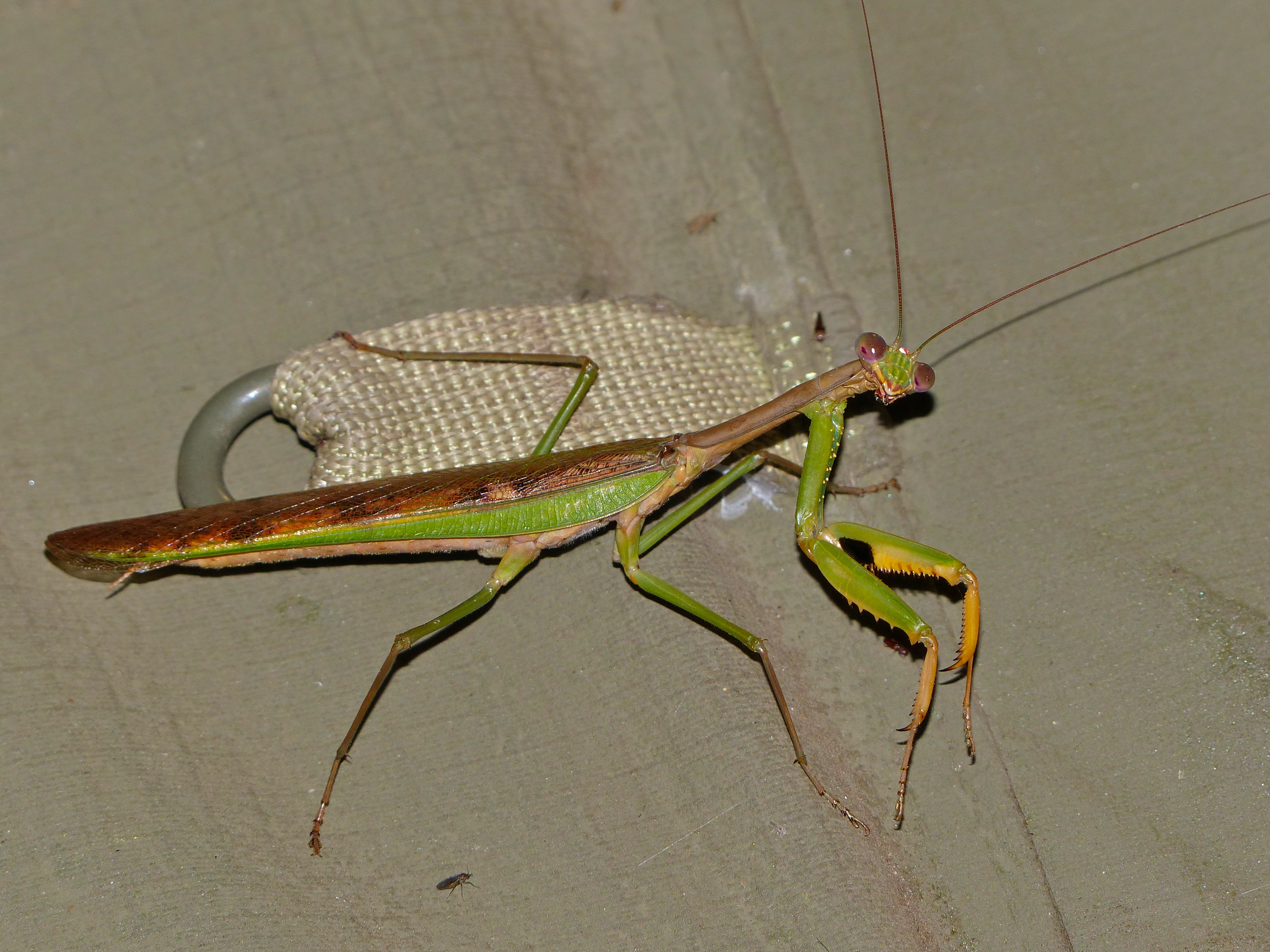
- Polyspilota aeruginosa

Scientific classification
- Kingdom: Animalia
- Phylum: Arthropoda
- Clade: Pancrustacea
- Class: Insecta
- Order: Mantodea
- Family: Mantidae
- Subfamily: Tenoderinae
- Tribe: Tenoderini
- Subtribe: Polyspilotina
- Genus: Polyspilota; Burmeister, 1838

= Polyspilota =

Genus of insects

Polyspilota is a genus of praying mantises in the family Mantidae. Species of the genus are native to Africa.

== Taxonomy ==
The following species are recognised in the genus Polyspilota:

- Polyspilota aeruginosa (Madagascan marbled mantis / Flag mantis)
- Polyspilota caffra
- Polyspilota comorana
- Polyspilota griffinii (Griffin mantis)
- Polyspilota magna
- Polyspilota montana
- Polyspilota pavani
- Polyspilota robusta
- Polyspilota saussurei
- Polyspilota seychelliana
- Polyspilota voelzkowiana

== Gallery ==
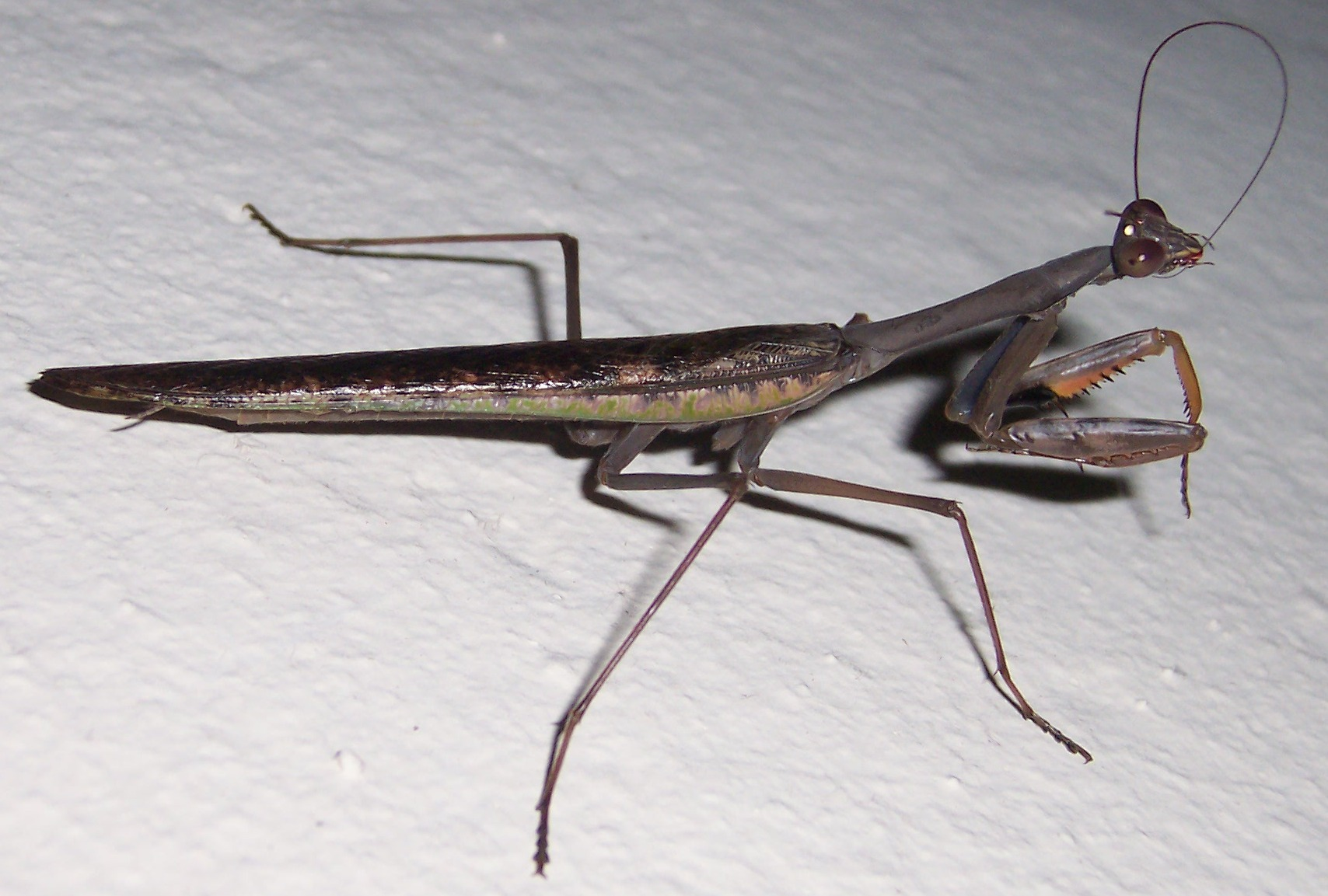

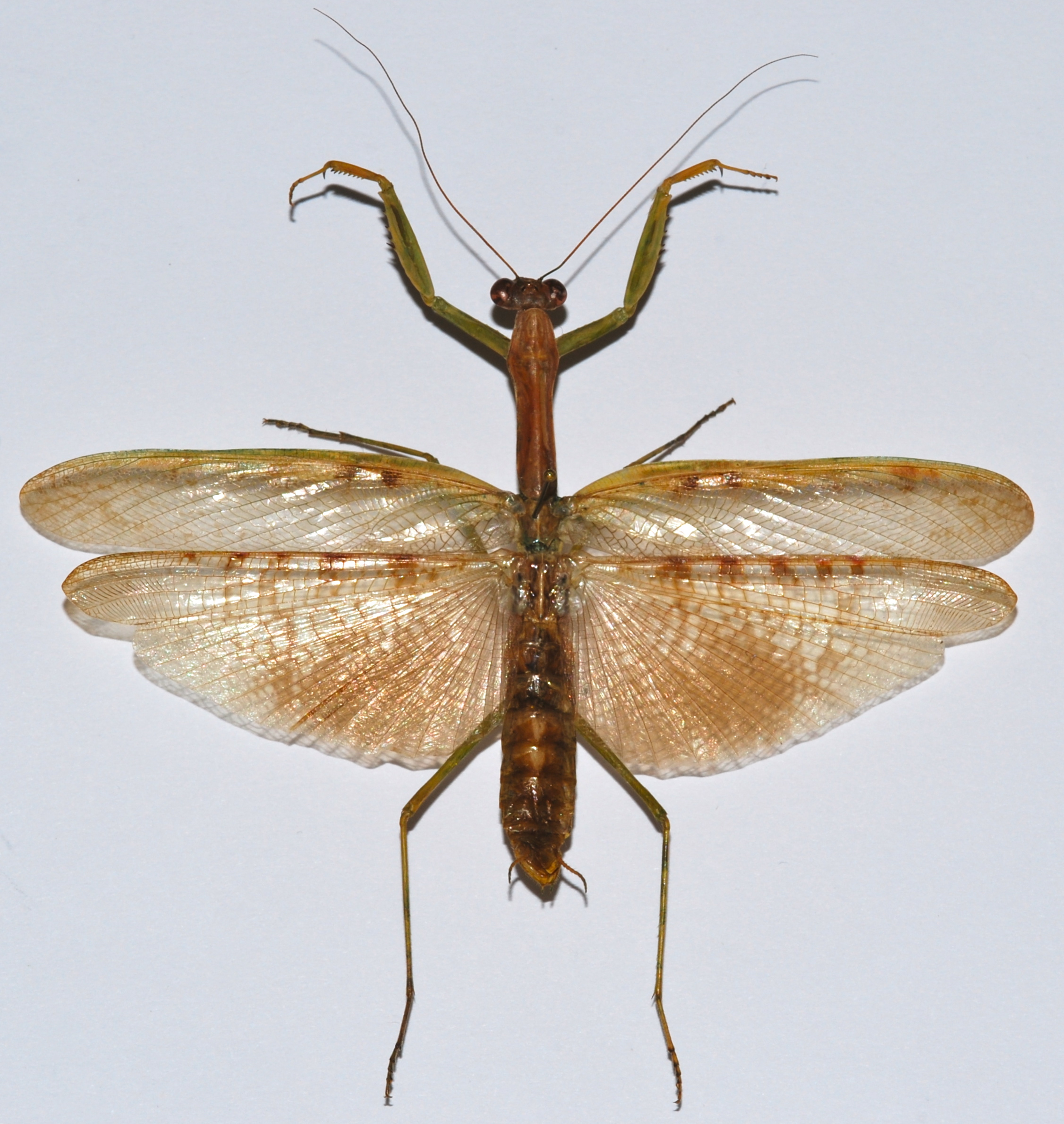

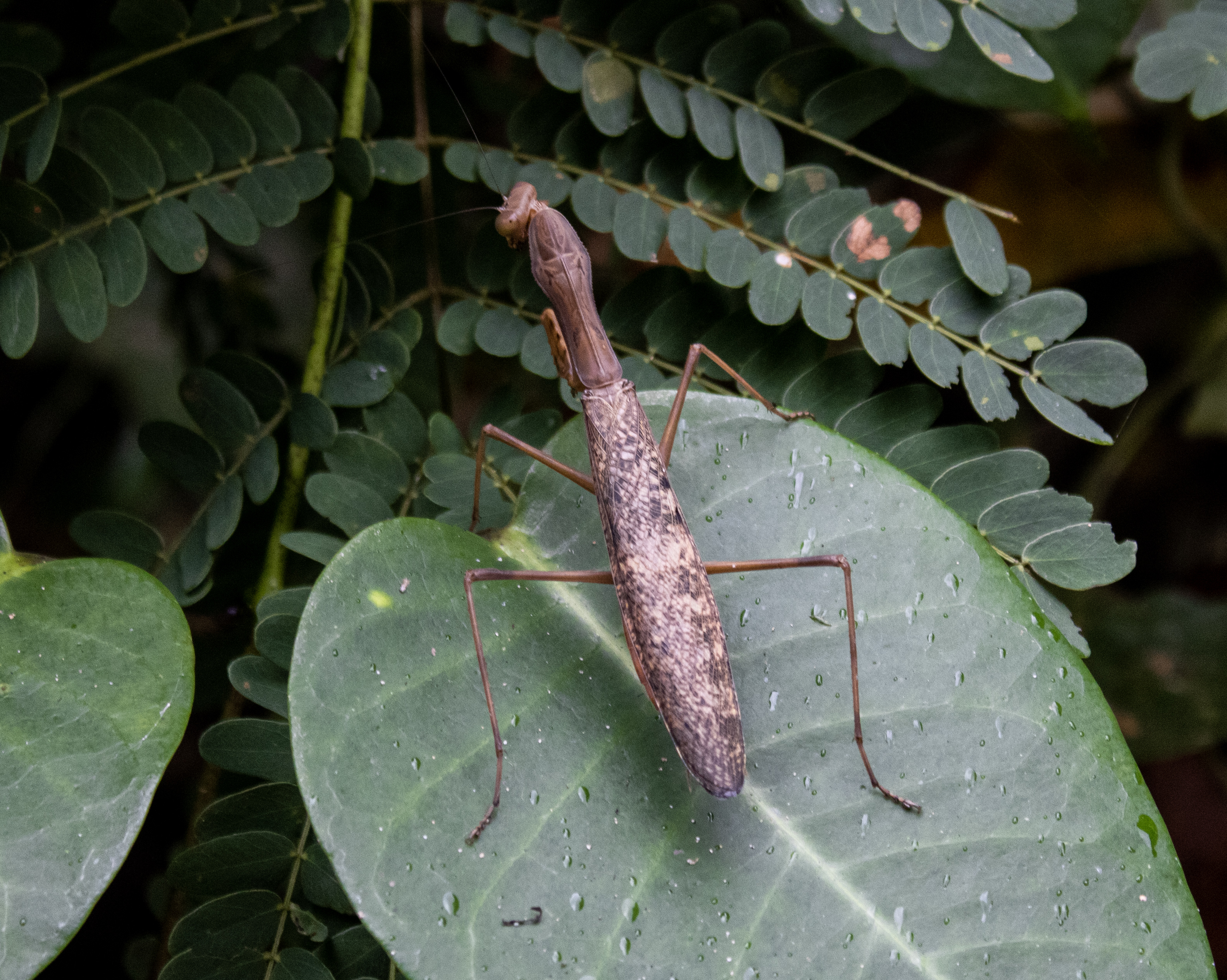

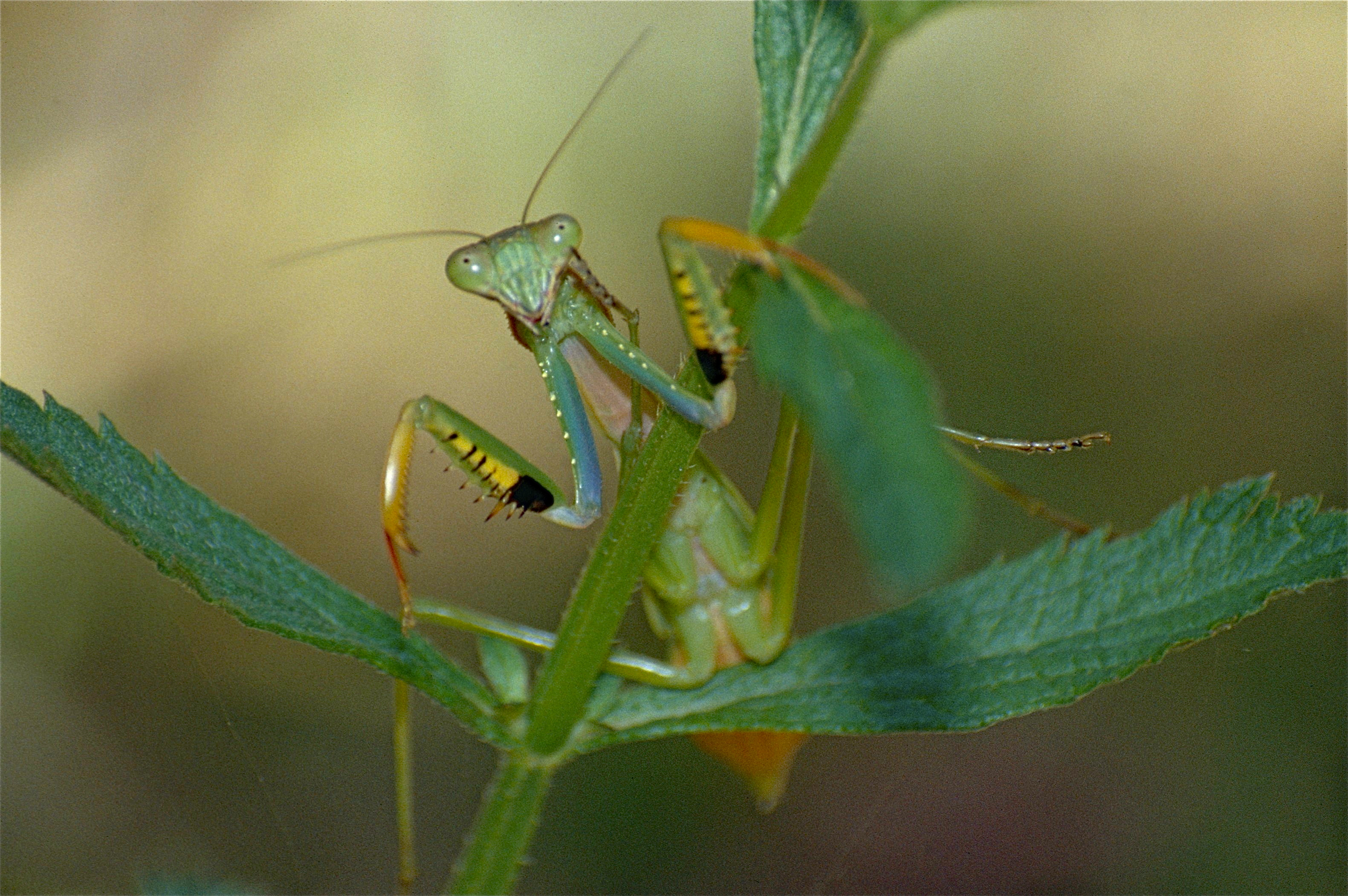

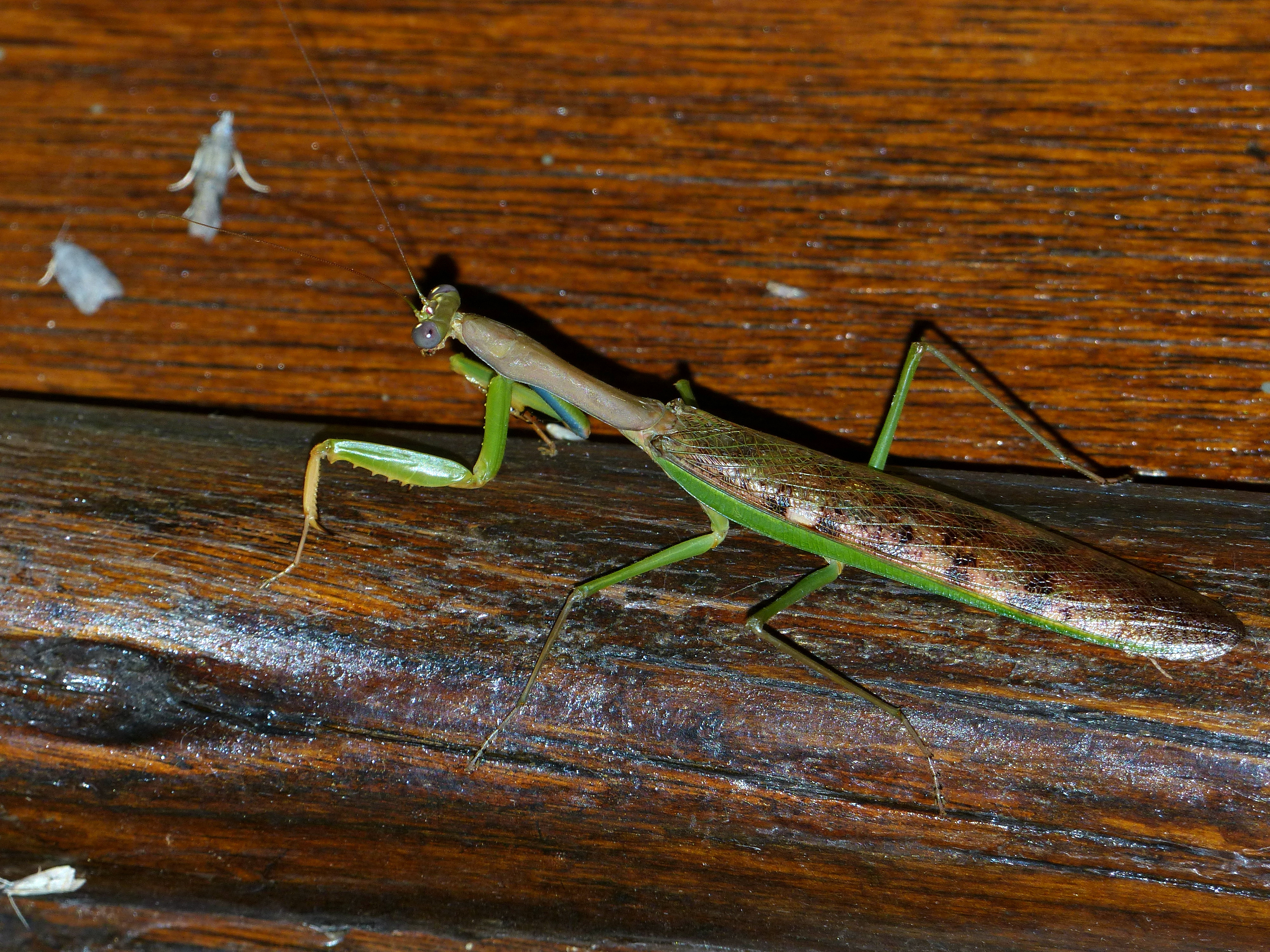
