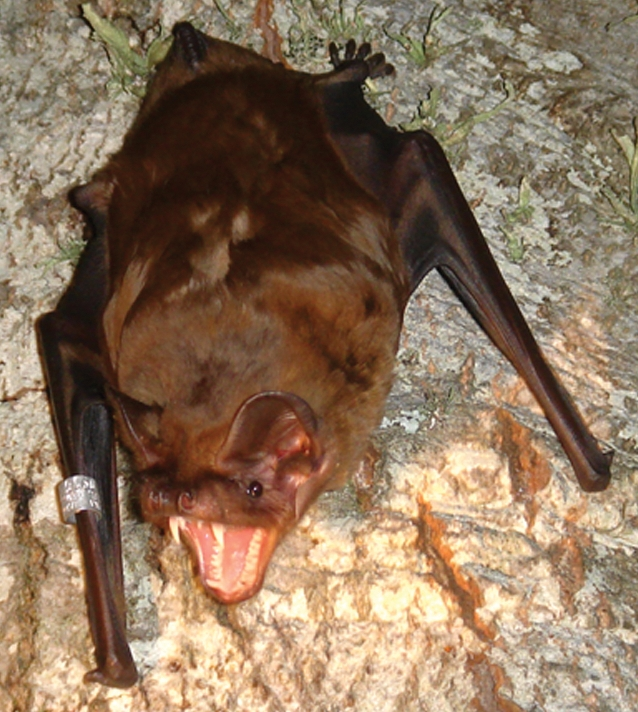
- Nyctalus lasiopterus showing its large teeth

Conservation status
- Vulnerable (IUCN 3.1)

Scientific classification
- Kingdom: Animalia
- Phylum: Chordata
- Class: Mammalia
- Order: Chiroptera
- Family: Vespertilionidae
- Genus: Nyctalus
- Species: N. lasiopterus

Binomial name
- Nyctalus lasiopterus (Schreber, 1780)
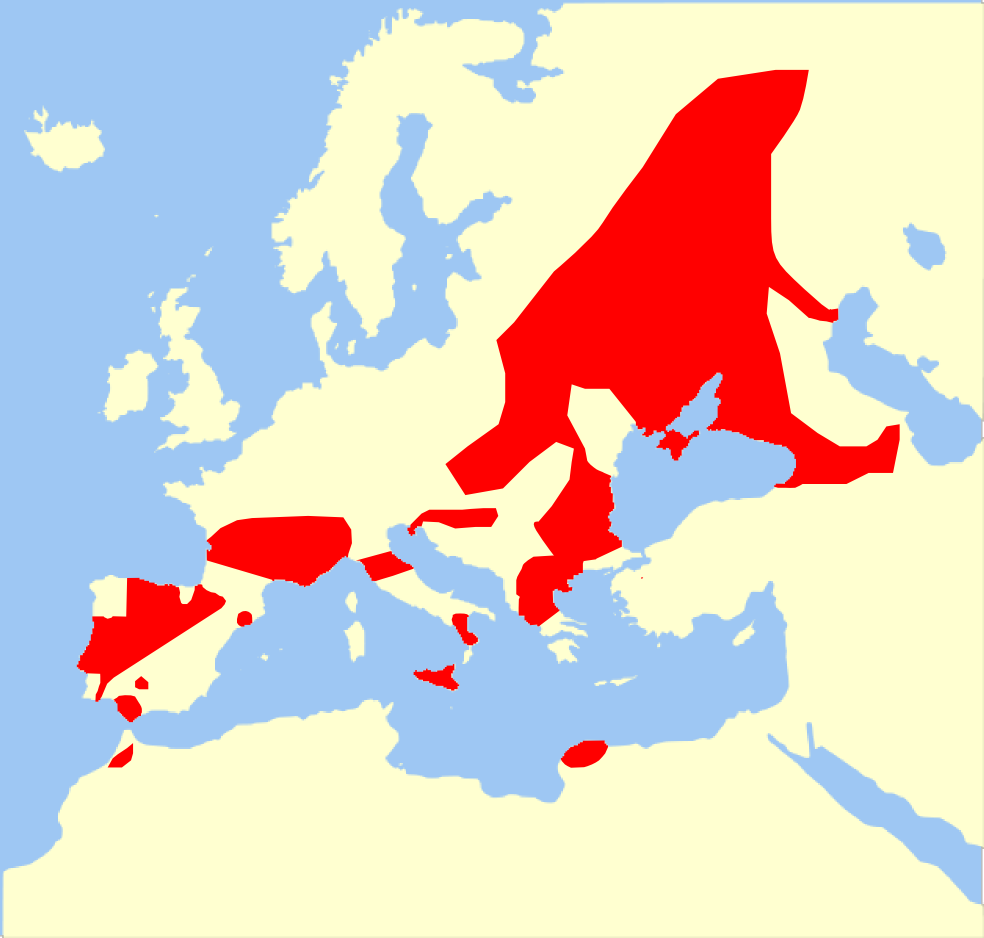
- Nyctalus lasiopterus range map

= Greater noctule bat =

Species of bat

The greater noctule bat (Nyctalus lasiopterus) is a rare carnivorous bat found in Europe, West Asia, and North Africa. It is the largest and least studied bat in Europe with a wingspan of up to 46 centimetres (18 in) and is one of the few bat species to feed on passerine birds. Greater noctule bats are the only bat species to hunt birds on the wing rather than when roosting. The greater noctule bat has wings adapted for open-air hunting and uses echolocation frequencies above the hearing range of birds.

== Description ==
The greater noctule bat belongs to the suborder Yangochiroptera (family Vespertilionidae) and uses echolocation. Echolocation is a perceptual system where echoes are produced by emitting ultrasonic sounds. Echolocation allows bats to compare the outgoing pulse with returning echoes which produces detailed images of the bat's surroundings. With echolocation, bats are able to detect, locate and classify their prey in complete darkness. The greater noctule bat has been observed as only emerging from its roosts well after dusk when it is completely dark. The greater noctule bat has keen hearing and sense of smell, however its eyes are poorly developed.

The wings of the greater noctule bat are thinner than those of birds, which allows it to manoeuvre quickly and accurately. While its wing is delicate and tears easily, it is able to regrow. The greater noctule is the largest bat in Europe, with a wingspan of 41–46 cm (16–18 in). Its head-and-body length is from 8.4 to 10.4 cm (3.3 to 4.1 in), its tail is from 5.5 to 6.6 cm (2.2 to 2.6 in) and its forearm ranges from 6.2 to 6.8 cm (2.4 to 2.7 in). The body mass of adults ranges from 41 to 76 g (1.4 to 2.7 oz). The greater noctule bat has been observed as a high altitude flier and a low altitude forager. The dorsal fur of the greater noctule bat is uniformly reddish-brown to dark brown. Its muzzle is broad with enlarged short ears and its tragus (ear) is broad, short, and mushroom-shaped. Calcar, also known as calcaneum, is present and it reaches close to midway to the tail membrane.

The greater noctule bat has a robust skull and its rostrum is square with an ordinary nasal slit. The zygomatic arches are very slender and the braincase is smooth, turned upwards. The sagittal crest is not present, while the lambdoid crest is well developed. Most of the projecting point of the skull is made up of exoccipital condyles. The basisphenoid is wide and deep and the tympanic bullae are relatively small.

== Taxonomy and evolution ==
Even though the fossil record of bats extends over 50 million years, their fossils are extremely rare. The fossil record of the greater noctule in the Iberian Peninsula suggests that they lived at different geographical locations from that of today. The fossils of greater noctule are almost non-existent prior to the Miocene epoch. The deterioration of the climate at the end of Neogene led to the disappearance of tropical species and vespertilionids profited by accessing a wider range of habitats.

== Habitat ==
The greater noctule bat is a tree-dwelling bat that roosts in trees all year round. It is found throughout the deciduous forests of Europe from the Iberian Peninsula to the Bosporus region of Turkey. The largest concentration of greater noctule bat is in the south western portion of Spain. The greater noctule bat is a tree-obligate species that prefers oak or beech trees that have a hollow space for day roosting. Greater noctule bats also roost in pine trees if there are no other options. Other studies have shown that this bat greatly prefers birch trees. The studies' differing results may suggest instead that the greater noctule bat does not prefer a specific tree, but perhaps looks for the physical condition of the tree. It has been noted in several studies of greater noctule bat roosting behaviour that different trees have different functions for the greater noctule bat, and that these tree-specific needs could affect roost selection for communities of greater noctule bats. Studies in Hungary (Ke´ kes peak, 1014 m a.s.l.) indicates that greater noctules prefer high roost locations. The study also suggests that older, decayed trees are preferred by the species.

== Diet ==
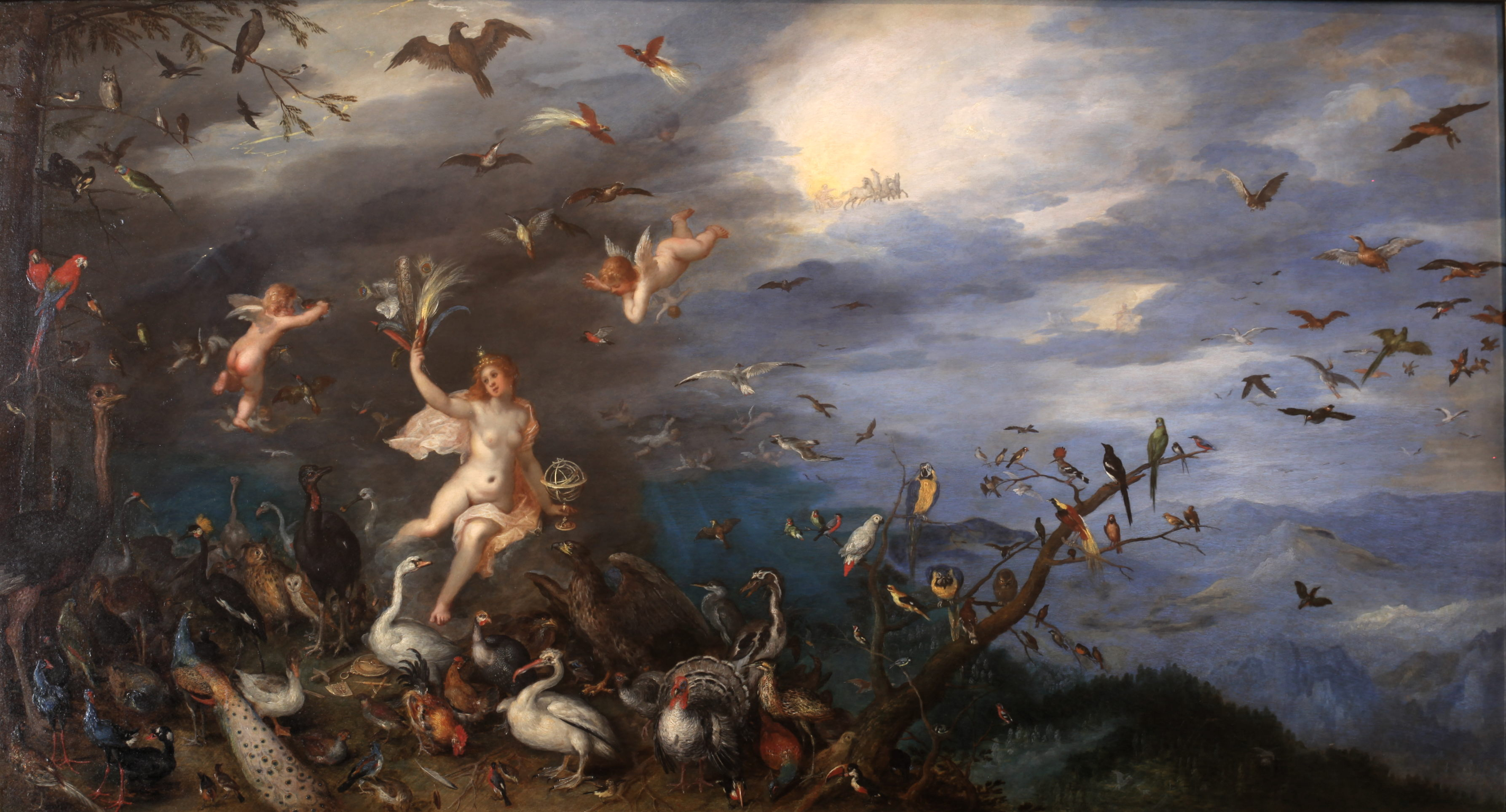
Air, Brueghel the Elder, 1611. On the top right corner, there is a noctule flying and biting a bird. It seems that Brueghel knew about noctules preying on birds, perhaps from finding bird remains in bat colonies during his time in Italy. However, actual noctules hold the bird with their legs and take bites while emitting echolocation.

While the majority of the world's carnivorous bats are insect eaters, greater noctule bats do regularly prey on birds. One study has shown that predation on birds accounts for over 80% of the greater noctule bat's diet during periods of the year when the birds are migrating. The greater noctule bat switches its prey type opportunistically depending on the time of year. In addition, with the possible exception of the Asian great evening bat, the greater noctule bat is the only bat that hunts birds on the wing rather than when roosting. The greater noctule is well adapted for hunting passerines in the air. It is large in size, has wings with a wingspan of up to 46 centimetres that are evolved for open-air hunting, and employs echolocation with frequencies beyond the hearing range of birds.

== Mating and reproduction ==
N. lasiopterus is understudied due to its rarity; very little is known of its mating habits, reproductive pattern, life cycle and sex ratio. N. lasiopterus, as a Nyctalus species, has an outstanding capability for migration which can possibly result in considerable seasonal changes in sex ratio. The studies in North-East Hungary indicates that the sex-ratio differs greatly depending on the location. Males were exceedingly dominant in Greece and the Czech Republic while females were dominant in NE Germany, the Moscow-region, Voronezh, and NE Hungary. This sexual segregation is due to difference in sex-specific thermoregulatory and energetic requirements. The females are dominant in warmer locations because it is optimal for fetal development and milk production. On the other hand, males are dominant in cooler locations because of lower energetic demands. These results verified that N. lasiopterus have nursing colonies located in Hungary.

== Ecological interactions ==
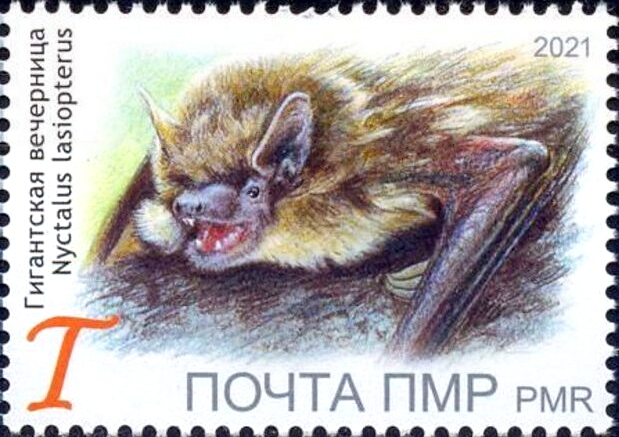
Greater noctule bat on a 2021 stamp of Transnistria

The greater noctule bat is known to participate in a fission-fusion society. These societies vary in size, but studies show that each society has a social order and a territory in a specific group of trees that are used for roosting and breeding. The greater noctule bat has been shown to travel between several roosting sites and to participate in several societies through radio tracking studies. It has been conjectured that ranking in society dictates different roles in society, e.g. some bats are scouts, others are hunters. There has been correlation between a specific bat's social ranking and the size of that bat's potential home range; the higher the social ranking, the lower the home range. The greater noctule bat has an observed active range of 2500 km^{2}. which is one of the largest observed ranges for any bat species. This large area of activity has several effects on the way the greater noctule bat forages and roosts. It has been noted that changes by humans to the natural environment could have had an effect on the way the greater noctule bat travels and roosts in its attempts to find suitable food sources. It has been noted that a lack of roosting sites near food sources could be the reason for the large home range that is displayed by the greater noctule bat. Differences observed between two populations of bats with drastically different habitats, Great Britain and Spain respectively, show that the greater noctule bat would not travel great distances for food unless absolutely necessary. This need to fly great distances for food has been suggested as a reason for the decline of the species. One study reported finding a greater noctule bat on the ground exhausted from flight. Another study of owl droppings found in areas in between GNB roosting sites has shown that the greater noctule bat is susceptible to predation in flight.

It has also been noted that the foraging range for the greater noctule bat increases during the lactating period for the greater noctule bat, potentially due to an increased need for energy. The greater noctule bat is also known to increase its foraging range in response to different levels of potential food sources. In the summer and fall months, when water levels and insect abundance is lower in the northern parts of Europe, the greater noctule bat has been found to increase its foraging range south to areas with a larger abundance of insects. The greater noctule bat is also one of the few known species of bat that also preys on nocturnally migrating birds. These birds tend to pause for rest during the day in the marshland fields that the greater noctule bat forages for insects in at night. When the birds start to migrate again at dusk, the greater noctule bat is known to prey on them during flight. These changes in habitat based solely on food source suggest that the greater noctule bat is heavily dependent upon areas that can support its food supply regardless of how far it must travel to get to their prey.

The greater noctule bat also interacts with parasites that live in the trees that they roost in and transfer themselves to the bats while they are sleeping. The greater noctule bat also interacts with the few nocturnal flying predators in its area, mainly owls that are much larger than the bat. Evidence of greater noctule bat bones have been found in owl pellets.

== Threats ==
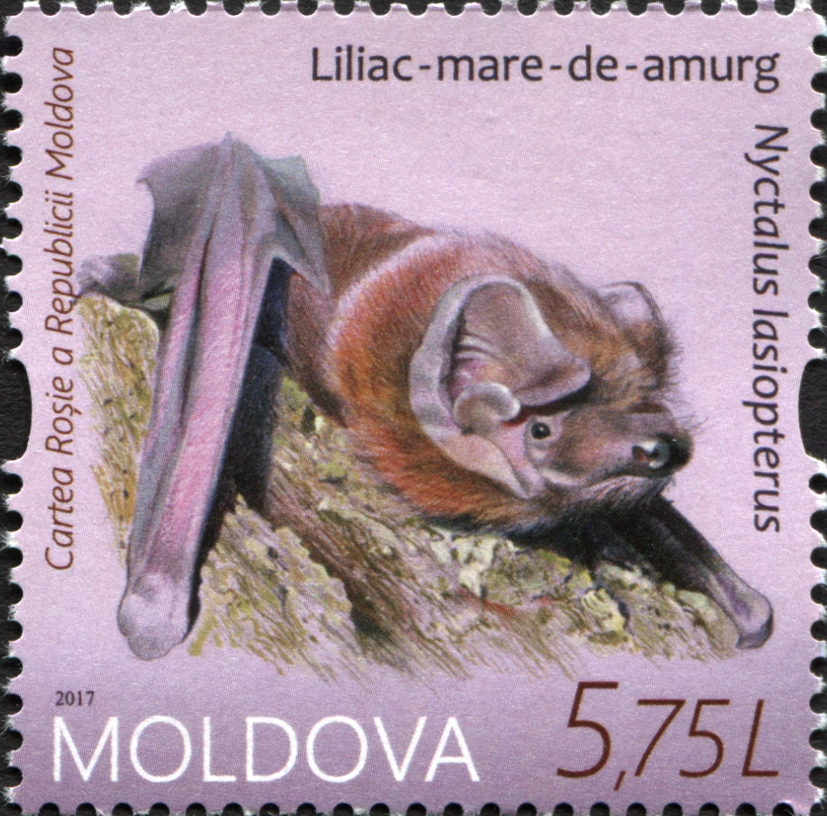
Greater noctule bat on a 2017 stamp of Moldova

The most common predators of greater noctule bat are the barn owl (Tyto alba) and Eurasian eagle-owl (Bubo bubo). The greater noctule bat generally leaves its roost to forage after it is already completely dark outside, and this coincides with the general time of day when these two owl species hunt. There is also some risk to the greater noctule from parasitism between bats. In Seville, Spain, one of the largest breeding colonies in Europe, the bats are in danger of obliteration. Rose-ringed parakeets (Psittacula krameri), an invasive species, compete for homes in tree hollows, and will attack and kill adult noctules before colonising their habitat. There has been an 81% decrease in trees inhabited by the bats since researchers first began keeping track.

== Conservation ==
The greater noctule bat is currently classified as Vulnerable on the IUCN Red List of Threatened Species. It is classified as 'vulnerable' in Spain (Ministerio de Medio Ambiente, 2006). No other country in Europe has a specific endangered status for the greater noctule bat.

=== Conservation proposals ===
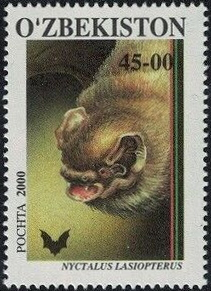
Nyctalus lasiopterus on a 2001 stamp of Uzbekistan

The organism separates itself socially and spatially with roosts. A colony has several roosts, with most of the populations centered in one large roost and several fringe roosts which other bat species may share. These are useful for sharing information between colonies. These roosts however can communicate disease and parasites. The individuals often fly from one roost to another to exchange information, and this also creates a pathway for infection. For reasons uncertain, such as being perhaps too advantageous to the colony, they continue to roost within these trees despite the disadvantages to themselves. It would be beneficial to the conservation of the species to locate the trees with roosts that have high levels of disease/ parasite infections in addition to high rates of transfers between roosts and cut them down to lessen the rate of infection among them. The functions of each roost also needs to be identified, as to understand which roosts would be better left intact. However, only day roosts studies were performed, and further research into their nocturnal habits may be required.

The species has not yet been well defined in their areas of roosting. Some have even been found to roost in caves and possibly housing, though whether this is typical behaviour or an effect of displacement is uncertain. Tracking the species by radio signals, it was found that the species prefers older, larger trees, specifically beeches, perhaps due to possessing relatively spacious trunks and branches, allowing for ease of entry. The species does not have one specific roost, but a network through which the colony can rotate individuals. Recent years have seen less reliance on fossil fuels and rather relying on wood as a source of energy, and consequently an increase in logging, therefore it is important to locate the areas in which they roost to identify those which should be protected to prevent their decline, through which radio tracking proves an effective method.
