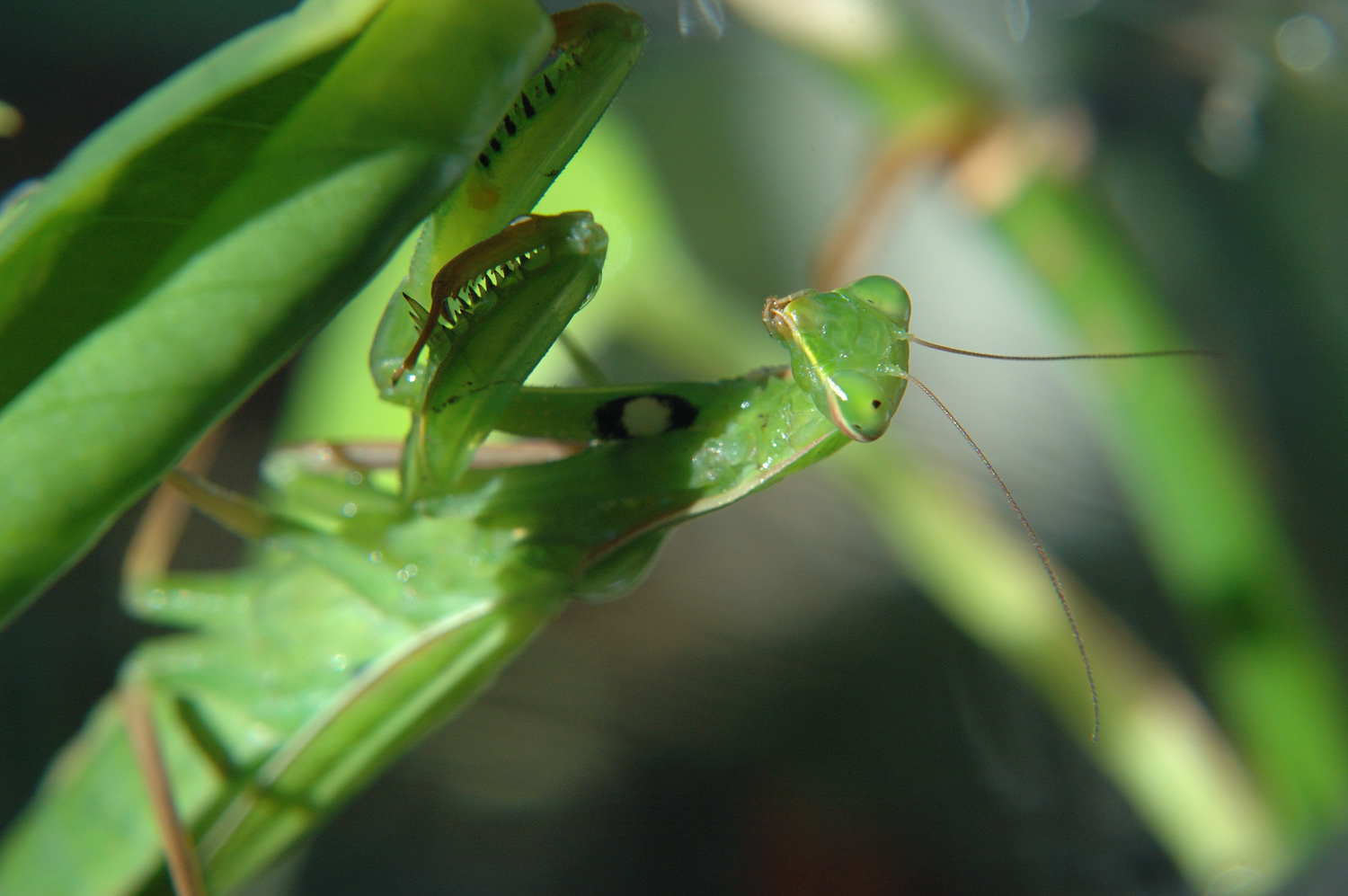

Scientific classification
- Kingdom: Animalia
- Phylum: Arthropoda
- Clade: Pancrustacea
- Class: Insecta
- Order: Mantodea
- Family: Mantidae
- Tribe: Mantini
- Genus: Mantis; Linnaeus, 1758

Species
- See text

Synonyms
- Mantes Geoffroy, 1764

= Mantis (genus) =

Genus of praying mantises

The genus Mantis is in the family Mantidae, of the mantis order Mantodea. Members of this genus can be found in Asia, Africa, Australia, and recently one species has been introduced to North America.

Some of its species have the common name "praying mantis".

== Species ==
Mantis is a small genus of mantises, which includes 9 species (others are synonyms):

- Mantis beieri Roy, 1999 – Democratic Republic of the Congo
- Mantis callifera Wood-Mason, 1882
- Mantis carinata Cosmovici, 1888
- Mantis dilaticollis Gistel, 1856
- Mantis emortualis Saussure, 1869
- Mantis griveaudi Paulian, 1958
- Mantis insignis Beier, 1954 – Angola, Guinea, Congo
- Mantis macroalata Lindt, 1973 – Tajikistan
- Mantis macrocephala Lindt, 1974 – Tajikistan
- Mantis octospilota Westwood, 1889 — "eight-spotted mantis", or "blackbarrel mantid", Australia
- Mantis religiosa (Linnaeus, 1758) — European mantis, or "praying mantis"
- Mantis splendida de Haan, 1842

== Photos ==
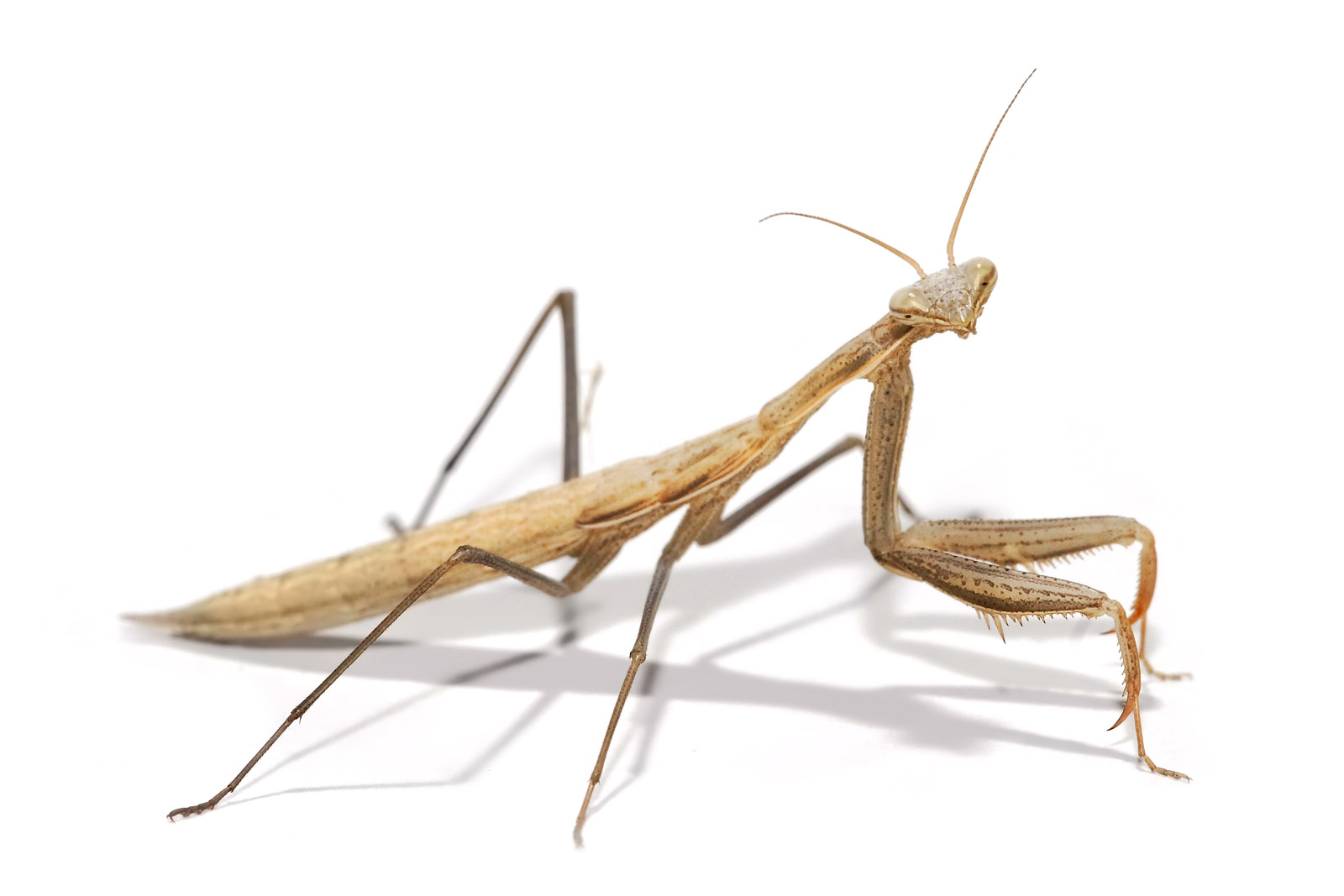
A nymph of Mantis octospilota from Australia.

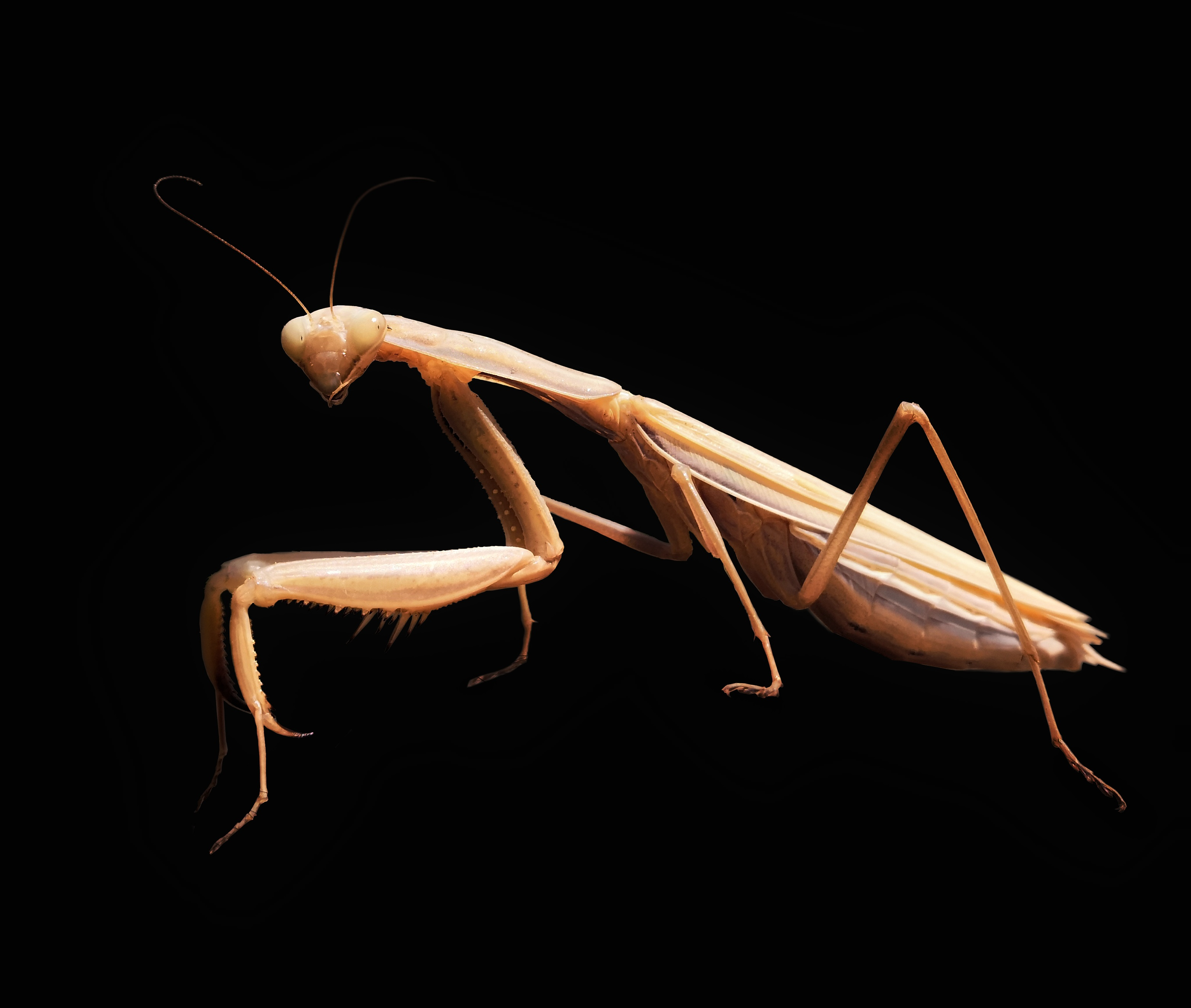
Brown adult female Mantis religiosa

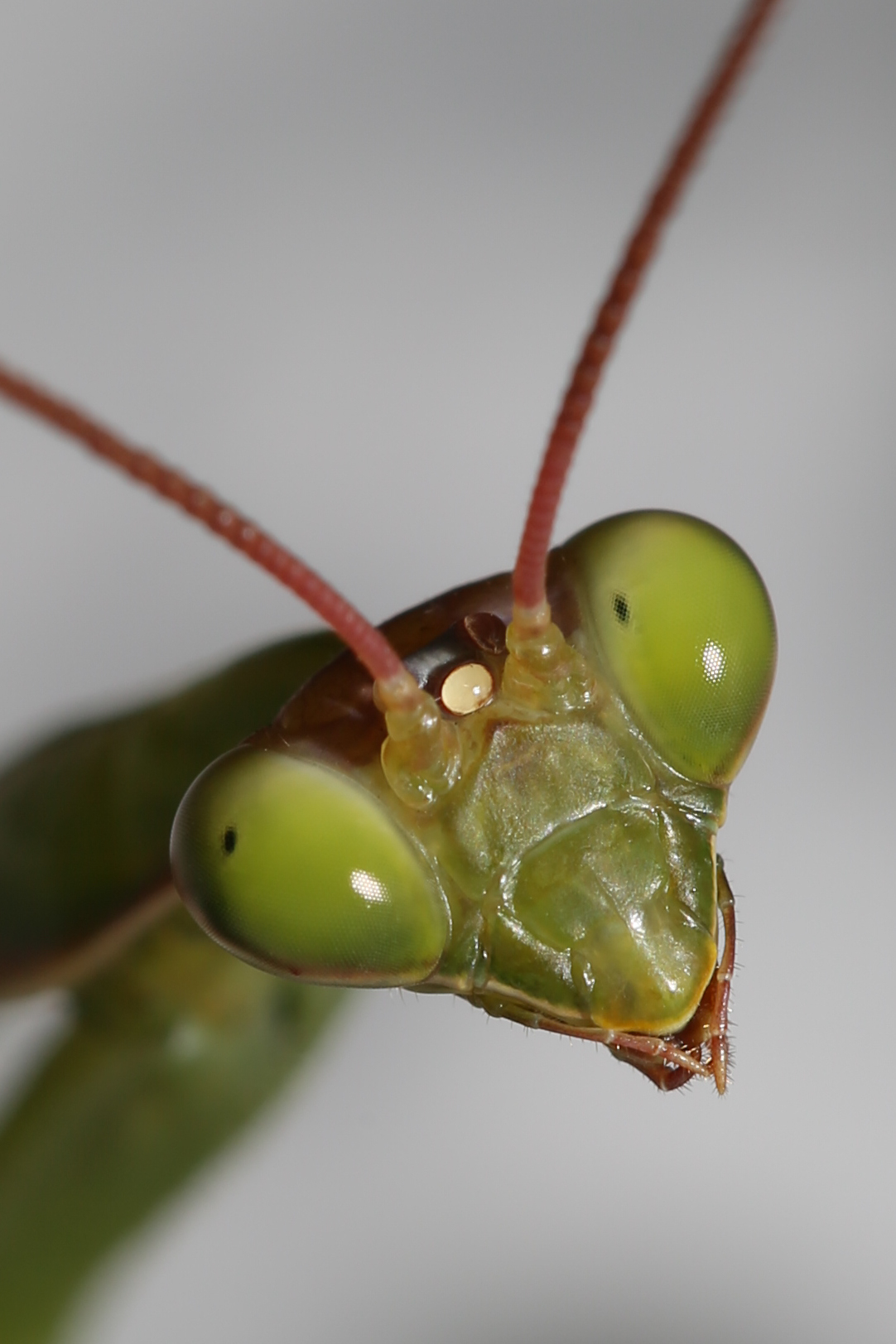
A closeup of the face of an adult male Mantis religiosa

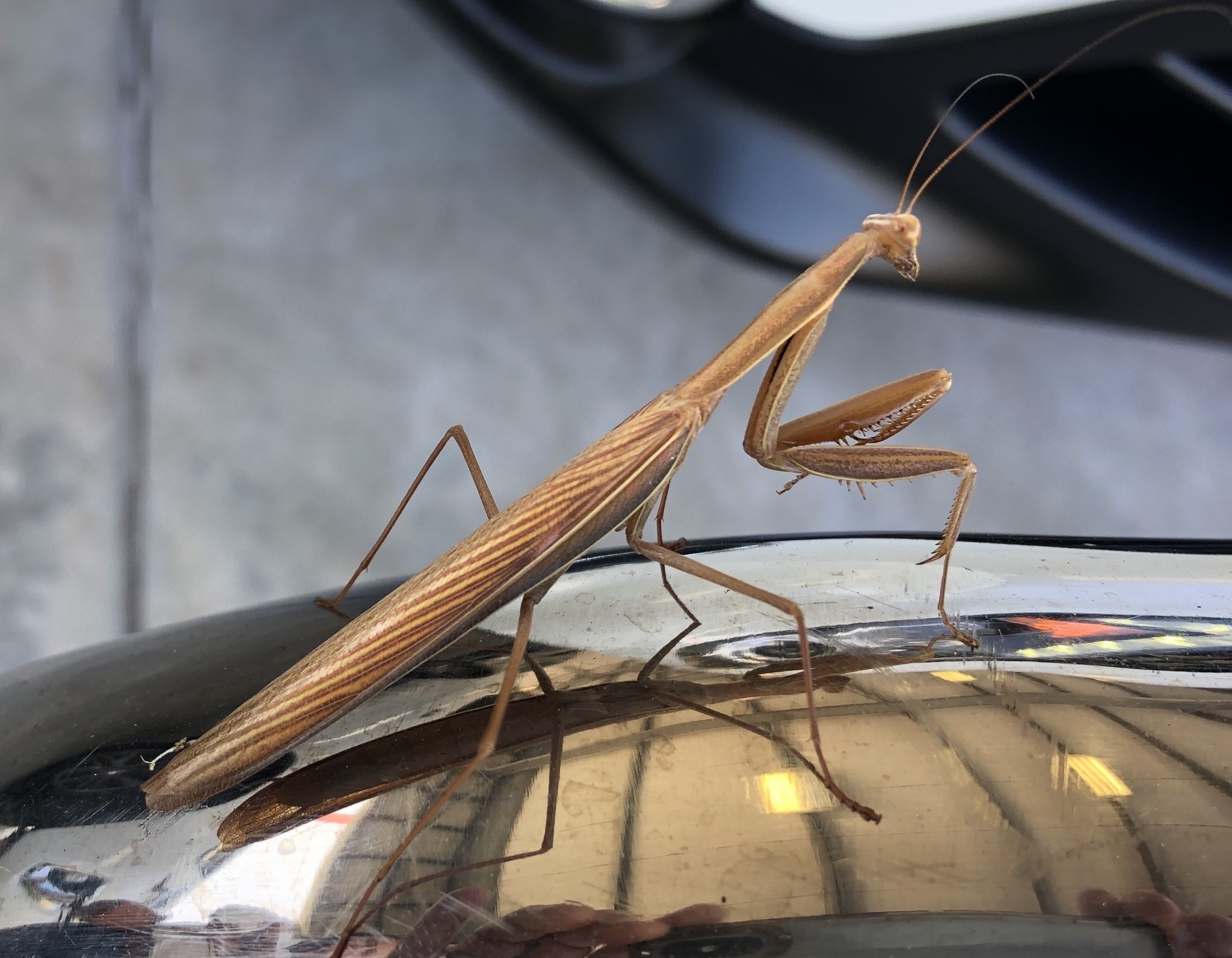
Mantis pia

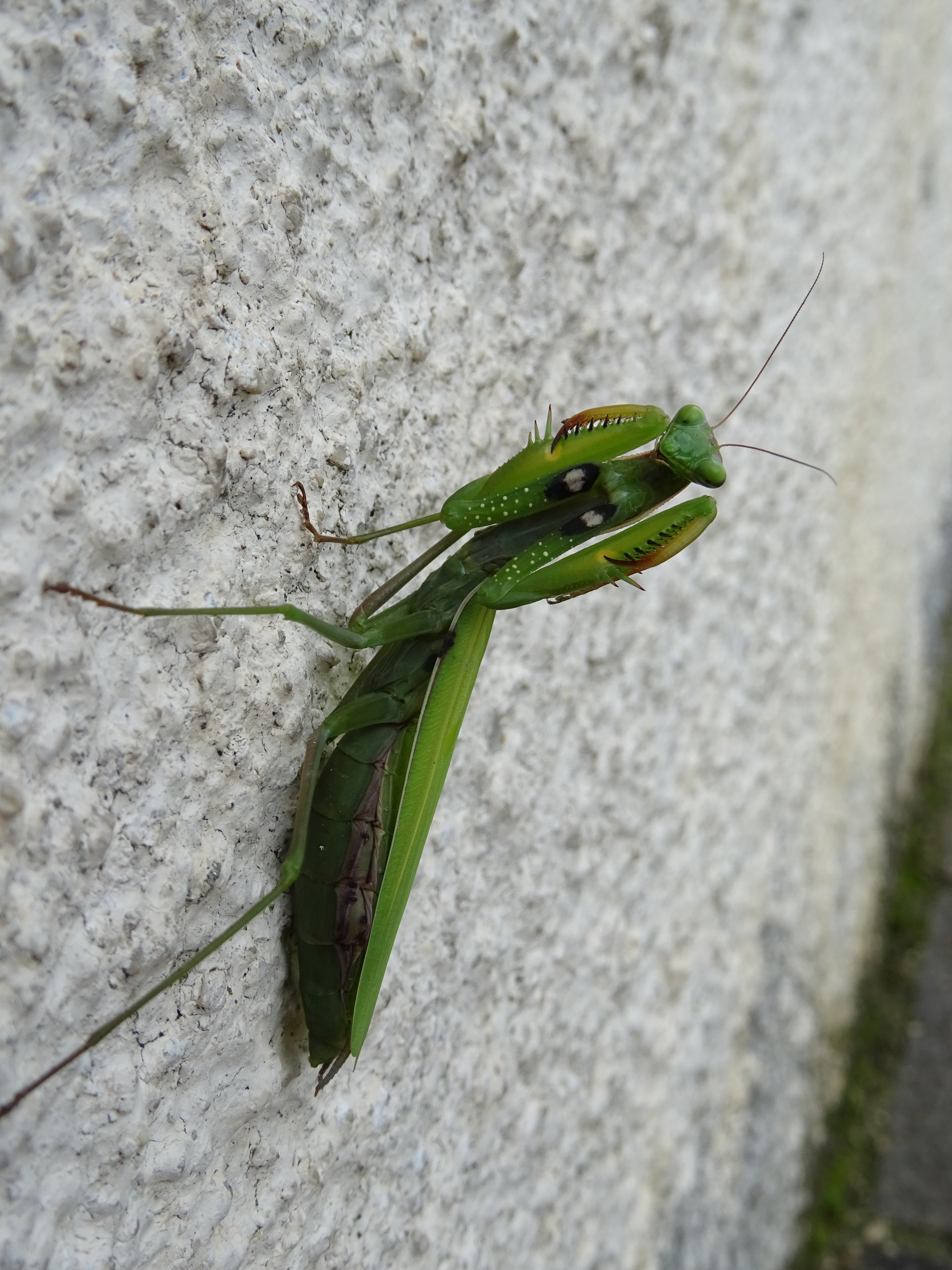
An adult female Mantis religiosa in defensive posture

== See also ==
- African mantises — in other genera.
- List of mantis genera and species (incomplete)
