= Cadorna's pipistrelle =

Conservation status
- Least Concern (IUCN 3.1)

Scientific classification
- Kingdom: Animalia
- Phylum: Chordata
- Class: Mammalia
- Order: Chiroptera
- Family: Vespertilionidae
- Genus: Hypsugo
- Species: H. cadornae

Binomial name
- Hypsugo cadornae (Thomas, 1916)
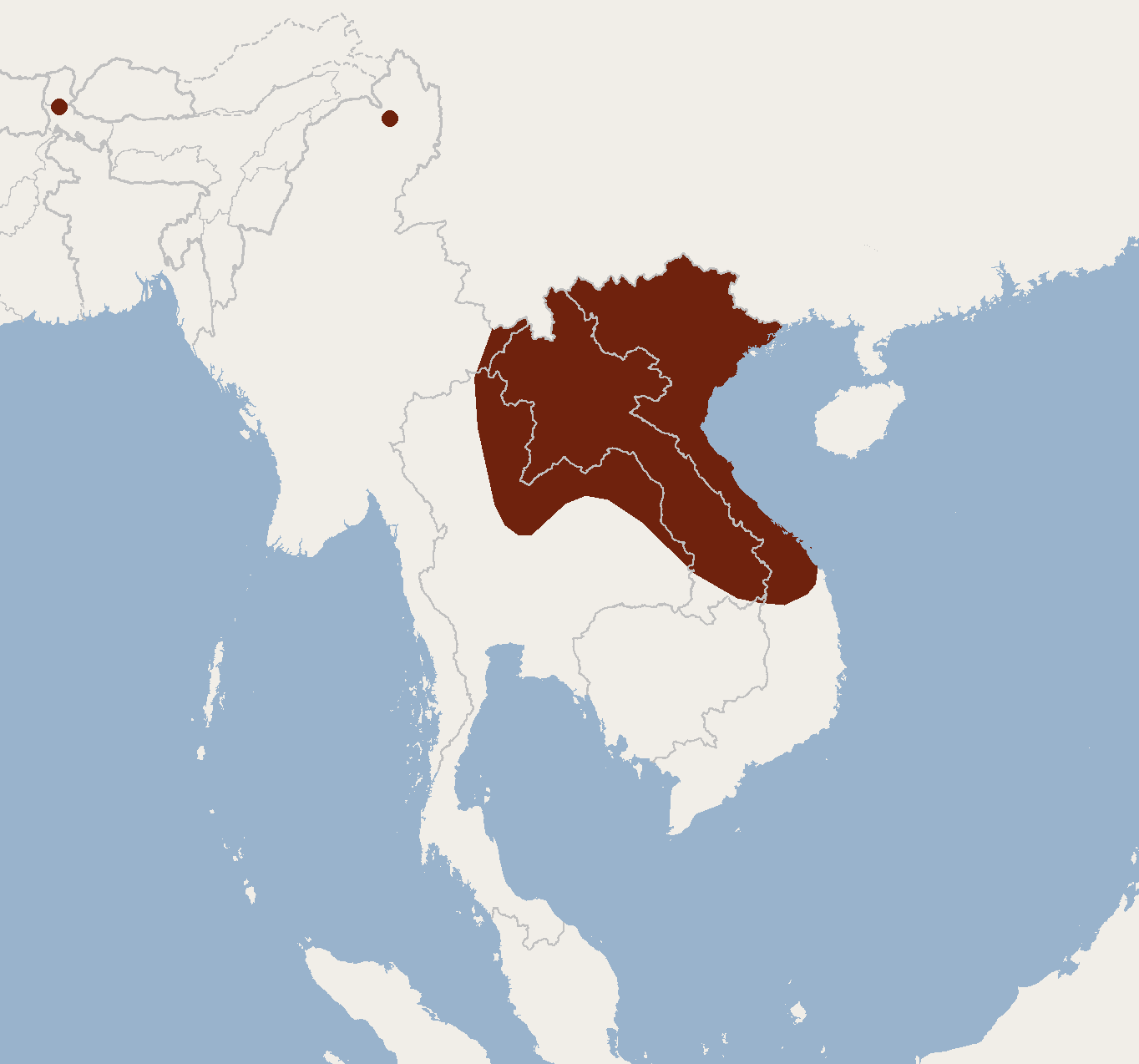

Synonyms
- Pipistrellus cadornae Thomas, 1916

Species of bat

Cadorna's pipistrelle (Hypsugo cadornae) is a species of vesper bat in the family Vespertilionidae. It is found in India, Laos, Myanmar, Thailand, and Vietnam.

== Taxonomy ==
- Philetor brachypterus
- - - Hypsugo macrotis
    - Hypsugo cadornae
  - - Hypsugo dolichodon
    - Hypsugo pulveratus
    - - Hypsugo savii
      - Hysugo alaschanicus

Relationship of H. cadornae with other members of its genus
