= Sandhan Formation =

Geological formation in India

- Stratigraphic range: Late Miocene, Tortonian
- Underlies: Milliolite Formation
- Overlies: Chhasra Formationn

Location
- Region: Kutch District
- Country: India

Type section
- Named for: Sandhan village, Gujarat
- Sandhan Formation (India)

Sandhan Formation is a Late Miocene(Tortonian) pseudoconglomerate formation located in Kutch district of India, it consists of two fossilferrous beds like Tapar and Pasuda. This formation has reports of several mammalian fossils that have correlation with Nagri Formation of Siwalik hills.

== Paleobiota ==
=== Rodents ===
Rodents of the Sandhan Formation
Genus	Species	Location	Materials	Notes	Image
Progonomys	P. morganae	Tapar, Pasuda		A murid.	
Progonomys	P. prasadi	Tapar		A murid.	
Dakkamys	D. asiaticus	Tapar		A murid.	
Myocricetodon	M. gujaratensis	Tapar		A murid.	
Democricetodon	D. fejfari	Tapar, Pasuda		A cricetid.	
Kanisamys	K. kutchensis	Tapar		A spalacid.	
Kanisamys	K. indicus	Pasuda		A spalacid.	
Sayimys	S. sivalensis	Tapar		A ctenodactylid.	
Tamias	T. sp.	Tapar		A sciurid.	
Tamias	T. urialis	Tapar		A sciurid.	
Tamias	T. gilaharee	Tapar		A sciurid.	
cf. Tamiops	cf. T. sp.	Tapar		A sciurid.	
Prokanisamys	P. sp.	Tapar, Pasuda		A spalacid.	

=== Soricomorphs ===
Soricomorphs of the Sandhan Formation
Genus	Species	Location	Materials	Notes	Image
Suncus	S. honeyi	Tapar		A soricid.	
cf. Crocidura	cf. C. sp.	Tapar		A soricid.	

=== Chiroptera ===
Chiropterans of the Sandhan Formation
Genus	Species	Location	Materials	Notes	Image
Nycticeinops	N. kutchensis	Tapar		A vespertilionid chiropteran.	

=== Primates ===
Primates of the Sandhan Formation
Genus	Species	Location	Materials	Notes	Image
Sivapithecus	S. sp.	Tapar	A partial maxilla.	A pongine primate.	
Lorisidae?	indet.	Tapar		A possible lorisid primate.	

=== Proboscideans ===
Proboscideans of the TSandhan Formation
Genus	Species	Location	Materials	Notes	Image
cf. Zygolophodon	cf. Z. sp.	Tapar		A mammutid proboscidean.	
Deinotherium	D. indicum	Tapar		A deinotheriid proboscidean.	

=== Perissodactylas ===
==== Equids ====
Equids of the Sandhan Formation
Genus	Species	Location	Materials	Notes	Image
Sivalhippus	cf. S. nagriensis	Tapar		An equid.	
Hipparionini	indet	Tapar		An indeterminate equid.	

==== Rhinocerotids ====
Rhinocerotids of the Sandhan Formation
Genus	Species	Location	Materials	Notes	Image
Gaindatherium	G. vidali	Tapar		A rhinocerotid	
Brachypotherium	B. perimense	Tapar		An aceratheriine rhinocerotid.	

=== Artiodactylas ===
==== Tragulids ====
Tragulids of the Sandhan Formation
Genus	Species	Location	Materials	Notes	Image
Dorcatherium	D. majus	Tapar		A tragulid.	
Dorcatherium	D. minus	Tapar		A tragulid.	

==== Suids ====
Suids of the Sandhan Formation
Genus	Species	Location	Materials	Notes	Image
Hippopotamodon	cf. H. major	Tapar		A suid.	
Kachchhchoerus	K. salinus	Tapar		A suid.	
Listriodon	L. dukkar	Pasuda		A suid.	

==== Bovids ====
Bovids of the Sandhan Formationy
Genus	Species	Location	Materials	Notes	Image
cf. Protragocerus	cf. P. sp.	Tapar		A tragoportacin bovid.	
cf. Gazella	cf. G. sp.	Tapar		An antilopin bovid	

==== Giraffids ====
Giraffids of the Sandhan Formation
Genus	Species	Location	Materials	Notes	Image
Vishnutherium	V. priscillum	Tapar, Pasuda		A giraffid, includes Giraffa priscilla.	
Giraffokeryx	G. punjabiensis	Pasuda		A Giraffid.	

=== Carnivorans ===
Amphicyonids of the Sandhan Formation
Genus	Species	Location	Materials	Notes	Image
Amphicyonidae	indet.	Tapar		An indeterminate amphicyonid.	

=== Squamates ===
Squamates of the Sandhan Formation
Genus	Species	Location	Materials	Notes	Image
Colubrinae	indet.	Tapar	Single vertebra.	A colubrine colubrid.	
Scincidae	indet.	Tapar	5 right dentaries.	A scincid.	
Agamidae	indet.	Tapar	Two fragments of Jaws.	A agamid.	
