= Alashanian pipistrelle =

Conservation status
- Least Concern (IUCN 3.1)

Scientific classification
- Kingdom: Animalia
- Phylum: Chordata
- Class: Mammalia
- Order: Chiroptera
- Family: Vespertilionidae
- Genus: Hypsugo
- Species: H. alaschanicus

Binomial name
- Hypsugo alaschanicus Bobrinski, 1926

Species of bat

The Alashanian pipistrelle (Hypsugo alaschanicus) is a species of bat in the family Vespertilionidae. It is found in China, South Korea, Mongolia, Japan, and Russia.

It is assessed as least-concern by the IUCN.

== Taxonomy ==
This species was first described by Nikolay Alekseyevich Bobrinski in 1926.

The genus Hypsugo was previously considered to be within Pipistrellus, but is now considered distinct. This species was previously considered to be a subspecies of H. savii, but is now considered a full species. The taxonomic status of the Korean population of H. alaschanicus is unclear, with it sometimes being considered as a subspecies, and it being considered as a distinct species called H. coreensis by other authors.

== Biology ==
The pipistrelle is likely an open forager. It is an insectivore. The bat echolocates at a frequency of around 35 kHz.

== Habitat and distribution ==
The species is common and widespread, being found in countries across Central and East Asia. It is found in China (Nei Mongol, Ningxia, Sichuan, Henan, Anhui, Shandong, Liaoning, Jilin, Heilongjiang, Beijing, and Hebei), Japan (Hokkaido, Aomori Prefecture and Tsushima Island), south-western Mongolia, far-eastern Russia, and the Korean Peninsula.

The species inhabits a wide range of habitats and roosts in caves, rock crevices, old mines, and buildings. The Alashanian pipistrelle has been recorded in forests, caves and other subterranean habitats. It has been observed at up to 1,280 m (4,200 ft) above sea level.

Summer colonies comprising tens of adult females, their offspring, and one-three adult males have been observed in Primoriye. In Mongolia, the species is known to inhabit arid areas with permanent water sources.

== Conservation ==
The bat has been assessed by the IUCN Red List as least-concern. There are no major threats to the species, but populations roosting in buildings can face disturbance. The bat is of no commercial or medicinal value. There is no record of any use of the bats in commercial trade.

The species is considered locally rare in Russia, and is listed as locally near-threatened in China. It is considered data-deficient by the regional Red Lists of Japan and Mongolia. It is present in protected areas such as the Songshan and Liangshui nature reserves, as well as some protected areas in Primoriye. Its presence in any other protected areas is unknown.
