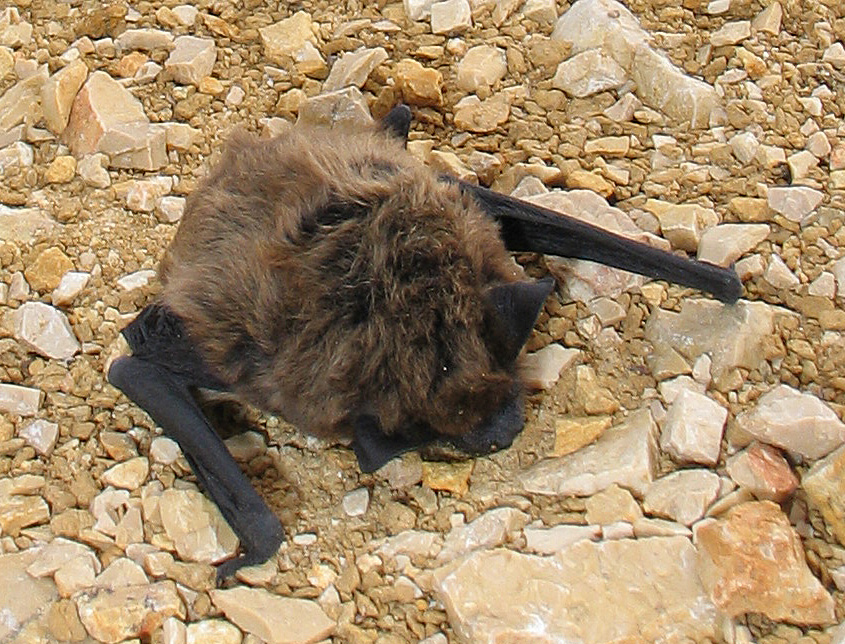
- Savi's pipistrelle (Hypsugo savii)

Scientific classification
- Kingdom: Animalia
- Phylum: Chordata
- Class: Mammalia
- Order: Chiroptera
- Family: Vespertilionidae
- Tribe: Vespertilionini
- Genus: Hypsugo; Kolenati, 1856

Type species
- Vespertilio savii Bonaparte, 1837

Species
- See text

= Hypsugo =

Genus of bats

The genus Hypsugo contains many bats referred to as pipistrelles or pipistrelle bats (not to be confused with the genus Pipistrellus). They belong to the family Vespertilionidae or vesper bats. They are primarily found throughout Asia, the Middle East, Mediterranean Europe, and North Africa (including the Canary Islands), with a single (debated) species in Sub-Saharan Africa.

== Species ==
- Hypsugo affinis Dobson, 1871) (chocolate pipistrelle)
- Hypsugo alaschanicus (Bobrinskii, 1926) (Alashanian pipistrelle)
- Hypsugo anthonyi (Tate, 1942) (Anthony's pipistrelle)
- Hypsugo arabicus (Harrison, 1979) (Arabian pipistrelle)
- Hypsugo ariel (Thomas, 1904) (desert pipistrelle)
- Hypsugo cadornae (Thomas, 1916) (Cadorna's pipistrelle)
- Hypsugo dolichodon (Görföl, 2014) (long-toothed pipistrelle)
- Hypsugo imbricatus (Horsfield, 1824) (brown pipistrelle)
- Hypsugo kitcheneri (Thomas, 1915) (red-brown pipistrelle)
- Hypsugo lanzai Benda, Al-Jumaily, Reiter and Nasher, 2011 (Socotran pipistrelle or Lanza's pipistrelle)
- Hypsugo lophurus (Thomas, 1915) (Burmese pipistrelle)
- Hypsugo macrotis (Temminck, 1840) (big-eared pipistrelle)
- Hypsugo mordax (Peters, 1866) (pungent pipistrelle)
- Hypsugo musciculus (Thomas, 1913) (mouse-like pipistrelle)
- Hypsugo petersi (Meyer, 1899) (Peters's pipistrelle)
- Hypsugo pulveratus (Peters, 1871) (Chinese pipistrelle)
- Hypsugo savii (Bonaparte, 1837) (Savi's pipistrelle)
- Hypsugo vordermanni (Jentink, 1890) (Vordermann's pipistrelle)

A 2019 study reclassified the African species H. crassulus and H. eisentrauti (as well as the subspecies H. c. bellieri, which was upgraded to a distinct species) into the newly described genus Parahypsugo. They have since been reclassified into the genus Nycticeinops.
