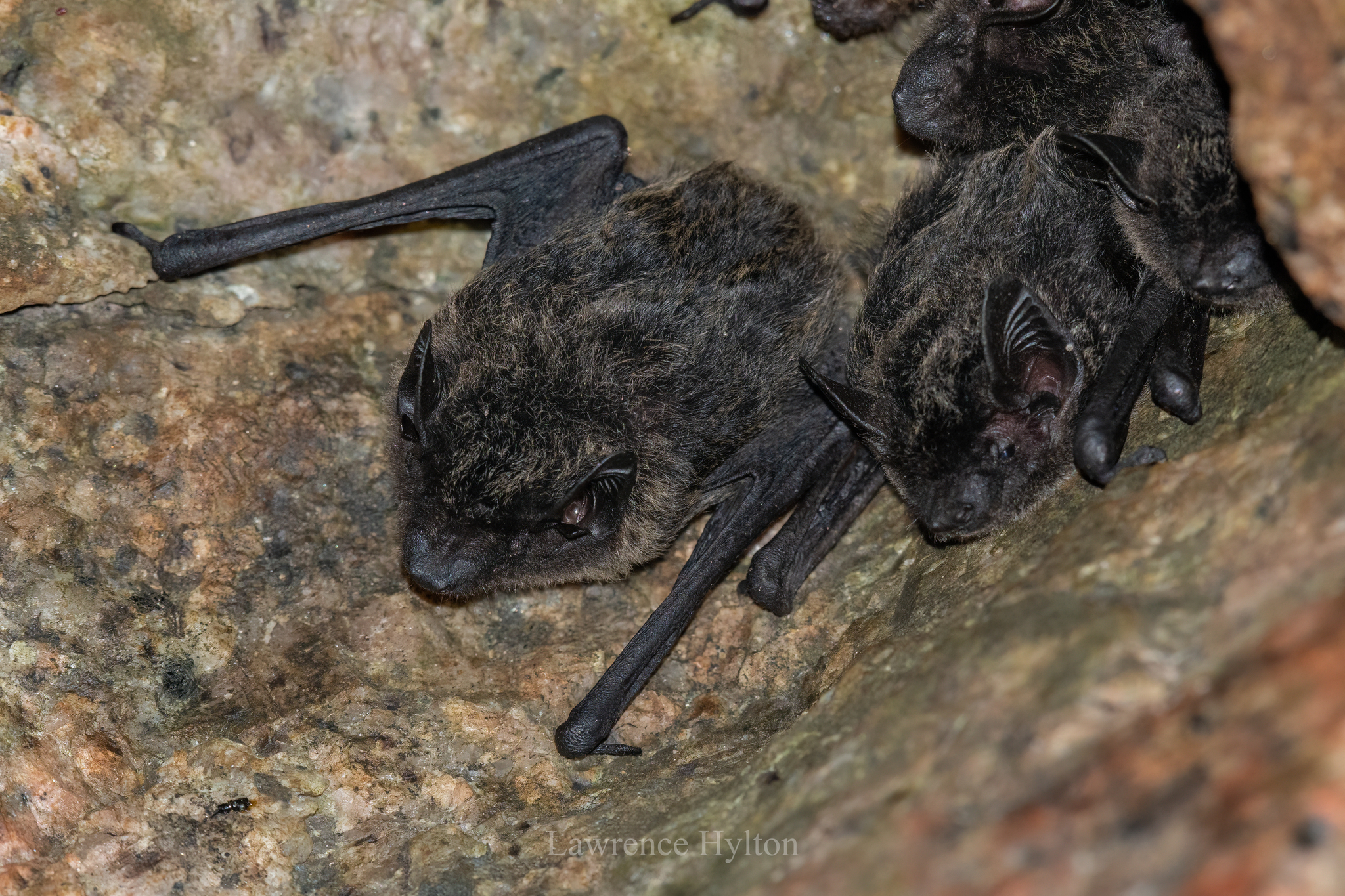

Conservation status
- Least Concern (IUCN 3.1)

Scientific classification
- Kingdom: Animalia
- Phylum: Chordata
- Class: Mammalia
- Order: Chiroptera
- Family: Vespertilionidae
- Genus: Hypsugo
- Species: H. pulveratus

Binomial name
- Hypsugo pulveratus (Peters, 1870)
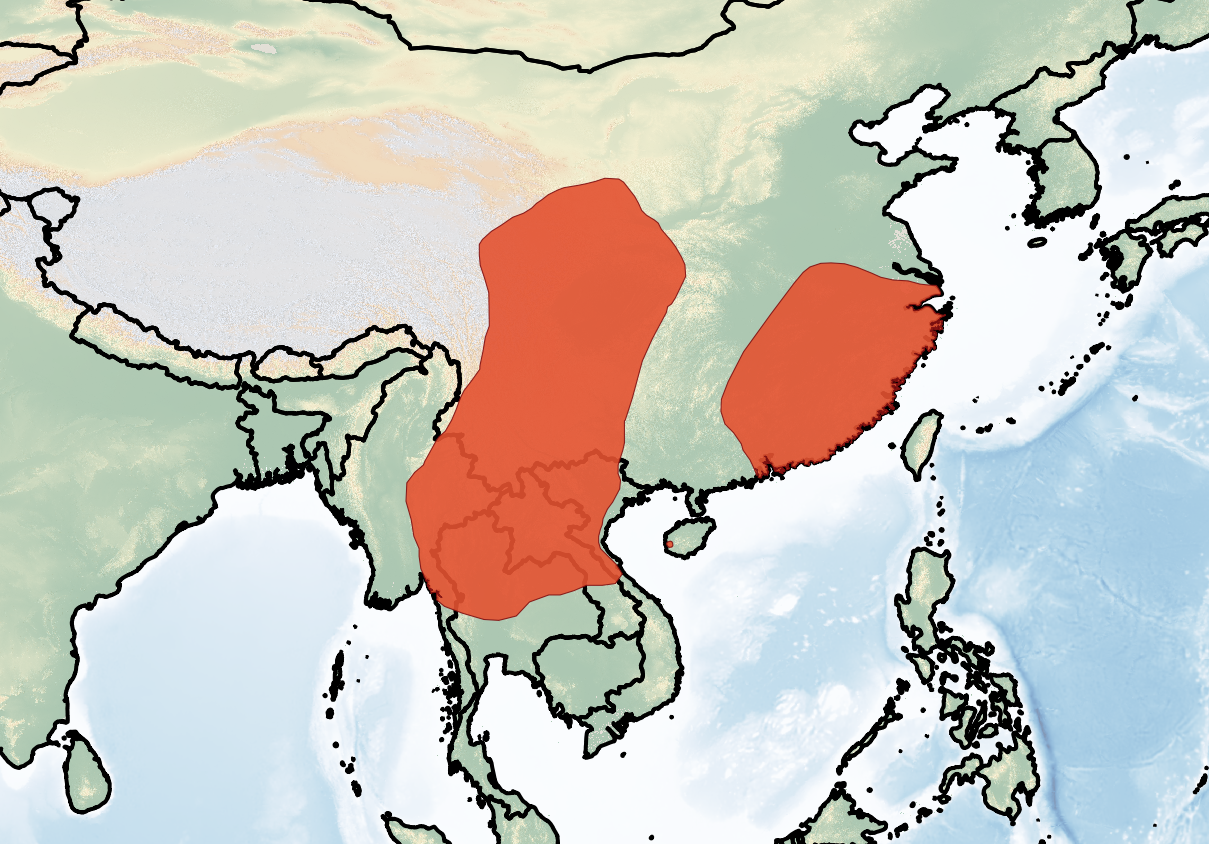

Synonyms
- Pipistrellus pulveratus (Peters, 1870)

= Chinese pipistrelle =

Species of bat

The Chinese pipistrelle (Hypsugo pulveratus) is a species of vesper bat in the family Vespertilionidae. It is found in China, Laos, Thailand, and Vietnam.

== Taxonomy ==
- Philetor brachypterus
- - - Hypsugo macrotis
    - Hypsugo cadornae
  - - Hypsugo dolichodon
    - Hypsugo pulveratus
    - - Hypsugo savii
      - Hysugo alaschanicus

Relationship of H. pulveratus with other members of its genus
