= Philetor =

Philetor may refer to:

- Erastes (Ancient Greece), an adult male in a relationship with an adolescent boy
- Philetor (genus), a genus of vesper bats
