= Pungent pipistrelle =

Conservation status
- Data Deficient (IUCN 3.1)

Scientific classification
- Kingdom: Animalia
- Phylum: Chordata
- Class: Mammalia
- Order: Chiroptera
- Family: Vespertilionidae
- Genus: Hypsugo
- Species: H. mordax

Binomial name
- Hypsugo mordax (Peters, 1866)
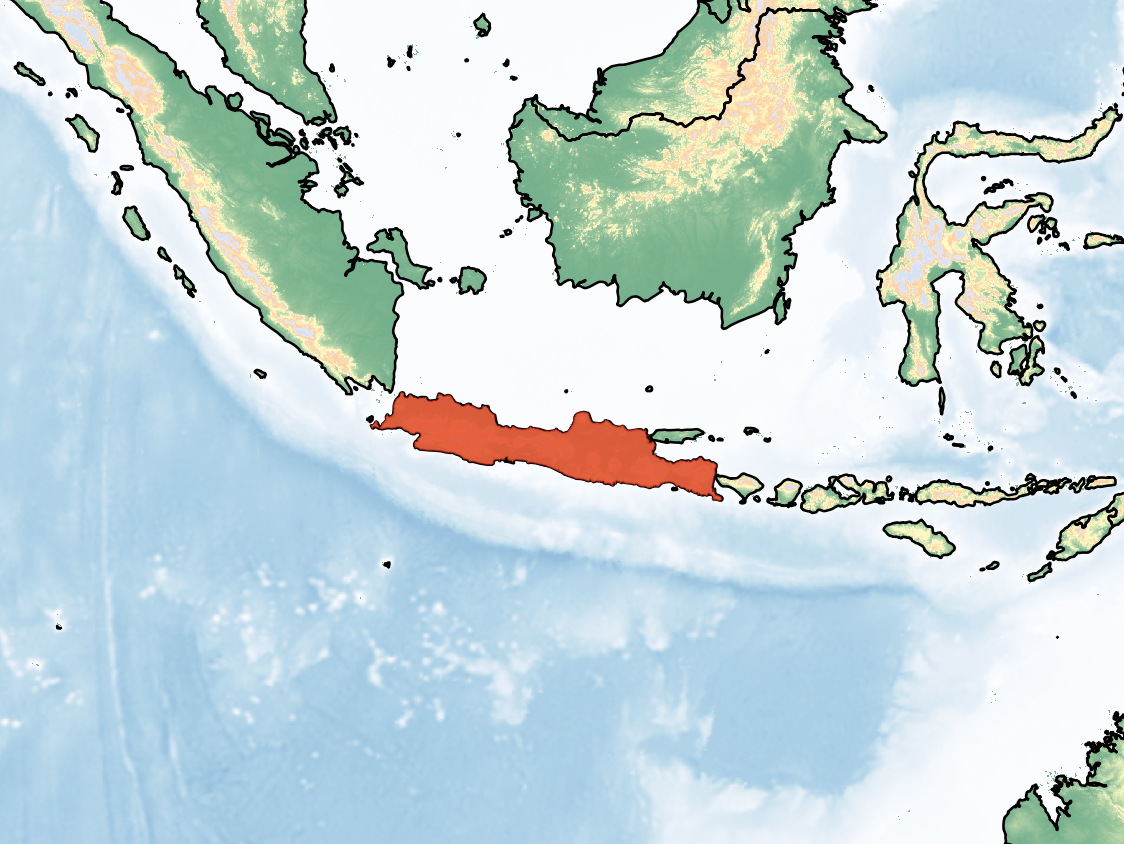

Synonyms
- Pipistrellus mordax (Peters, 1866); Falsistrellus mordax

Species of bat

The pungent pipistrelle (Hypsugo mordax) is a species of vesper bat in the family Vespertilionidae. It is found in Indonesia and possibly the Philippines.

Formerly classified in the genus Falsistrellus, phylogenetic evidence supports it belonging to the genus Hypsugo.
