= Tapar =

Tapar can refer to:

People

- Muhammad I Tapar, a Sultan of the Seljuq Empire from 1105–1118
- Tapar, a Visayan shaman in the Philippines who led a native revolt against the Spanish Empire in 1663

Other

- Tapar, a trade name for paracetamol
- Tapar locality, a Late Miocene aged fossiliferous locality located in Kutch district of Gujarat, India.
