= Socotran pipistrelle =

Conservation status
- Endangered (IUCN 3.1)

Scientific classification
- Kingdom: Animalia
- Phylum: Chordata
- Class: Mammalia
- Order: Chiroptera
- Family: Vespertilionidae
- Genus: Hypsugo
- Species: H. lanzai

Binomial name
- Hypsugo lanzai Benda, Al-Jumaily, Reiter, & Nasher, 2011
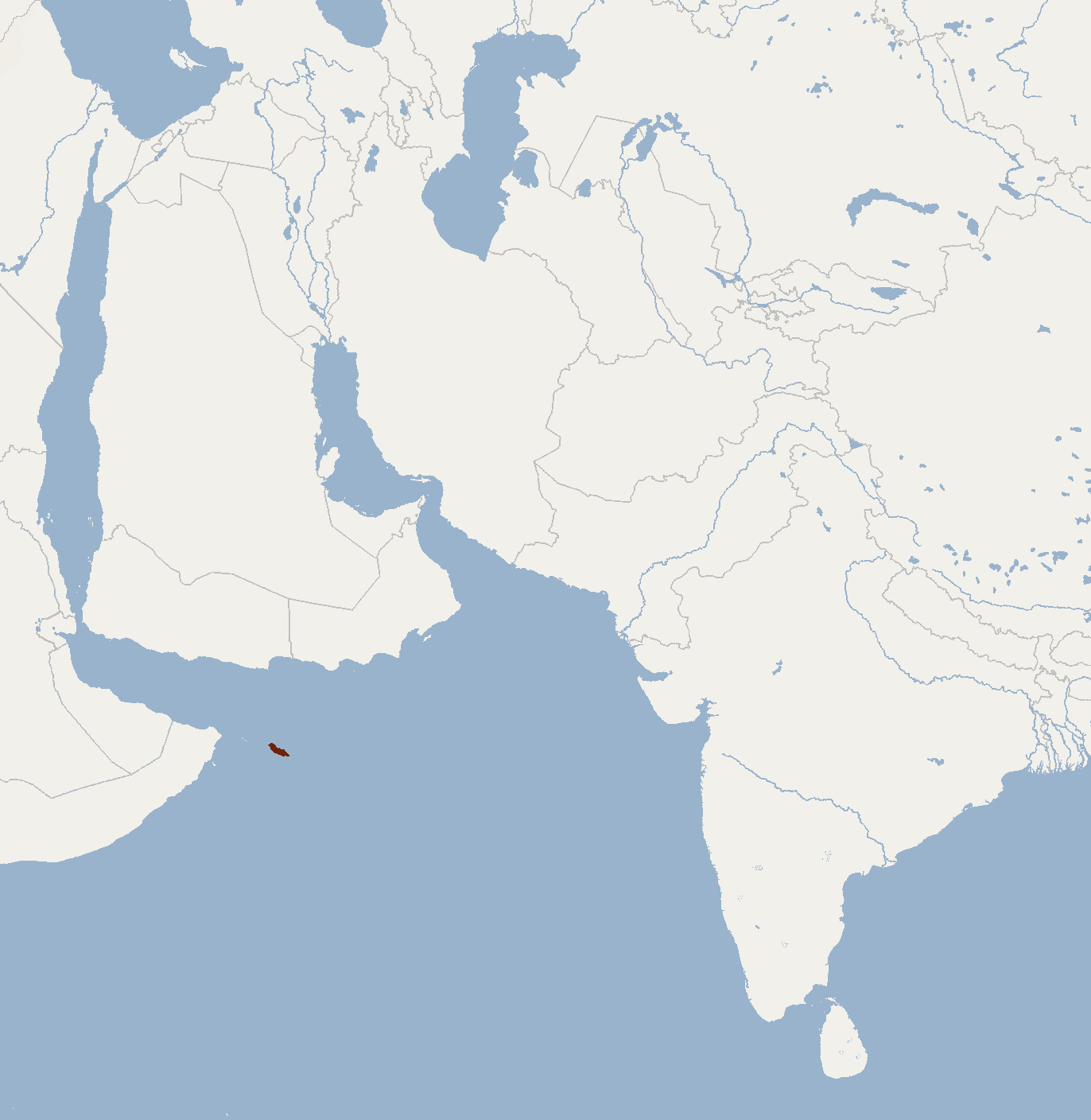
- Socotran pipistrelle range

Endangered species of bat

The Socotran pipistrelle or Lanza's pipistrelle (Hypsugo lanzai) is an endangered species of vesper bat in the family Vespertilionidae. It is endemic to Socotra Island in Yemen, and is the only mammal thought to be endemic to the island.

== Taxonomy ==
Previously thought to represent an insular population of the desert pipistrelle (H. ariel), a 2011 study found it to be morphologically distinct from other Hypsugo species, and described it as a distinct species. It is named after Italian biologist Benedetto Lanza. It is recognized as a distinct species by the IUCN Red List, American Society of Mammalogists, and ITIS.

== Distribution and habitat ==
It is found only on Socotra, where it is found throughout at all altitudes. It inhabits sparse, dry xeric shrubland habitat.

== Description ==
It is the largest member of the arabicus-group of Hypsugo (also including H. ariel and the Arabian pipistrelle, H. arabicus). Its braincase is higher compared to the other species in the group. It is also much darker in coloration than other members of the group.

== Status ==
This species has a restricted range, being found only on a single island. It is thought to be threatened by climate change, primarily due to more frequent major tropical cyclones (with the 2015 and 2019 cyclone seasons being thought to have been especially damaging), as well as increasing aridification of its habitat. It is also thought to be threatened by increasing unplanned development in the area, which may have further knock-on effects on the already-stressed ecosystem.
