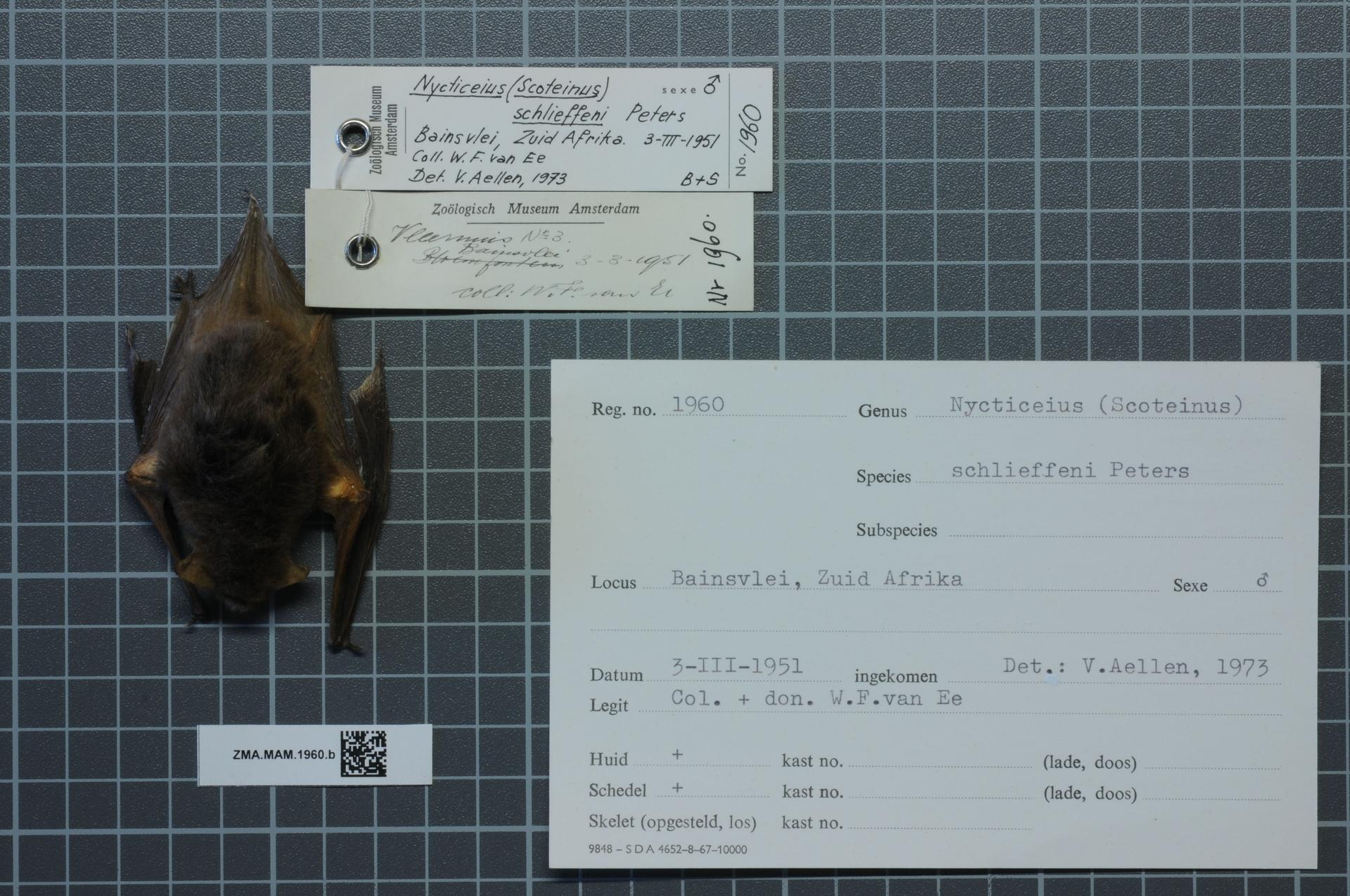
- Schlieffen's serotine (N. schlieffeni)

Scientific classification
- Kingdom: Animalia
- Phylum: Chordata
- Class: Mammalia
- Order: Chiroptera
- Family: Vespertilionidae
- Tribe: Vespertilionini
- Genus: Nycticeinops; Hill and Harrison, 1987

Type species
- Nycticeius schlieffeni Peters, 1859

Species
- See text

Synonyms
- Parahypsugo Hutterer, Decher, Monadjem, and Astrin, 2019

= Nycticeinops =

Nycticeinops Temporal range: Miocene–Present

Genus of bats

Nycticeinops is a genus of vesper bat in the family Vespertilionidae. It contains the following species:

- Bellier's serotine, Nycticeinops bellieri
- Broad-headed serotine, Nycticeinops crassulus
- Eisentraut's serotine, Nycticeinops eisentrauti
- Grandidier's serotine, Nycticeinops grandidieri
- Happolds's serotine, Nycticeinops happoldorum
- Large-headed serotine, Nycticeinops macrocephalus
- Schlieffen's serotine, Nycticeinops schlieffeni

Formerly, the only species placed in this genus was Schlieffen's serotine (N. schlieffeni), but phylogenetic evidence has placed several other species in this genus. These species were formerly classified in either Pipistrellus, Neoromicia, or Hypsugo until being reclassified into the new genus Parahypsugo in 2019. In a 2020 study, Nycticeinops was found to contain Parahypsugo, and thus both were synonymized.

The fossil species of Nycticeinops serengetiensis and Nycticeinops kutchensis are also known. N. kutchensis known from c. 11 Ma of Kutch in Gujarat (India) is the oldest record for this modern genus.
