= Falsistrellus =

Scientific classification
- Kingdom: Animalia
- Phylum: Chordata
- Class: Mammalia
- Infraclass: Placentalia
- Order: Chiroptera
- Family: Vespertilionidae
- Tribe: Vespertilionini
- Genus: Falsistrellus; Troughton, 1943

Type species
- Vespertilio tasmaniensis Gould, 1858

Genus of bats

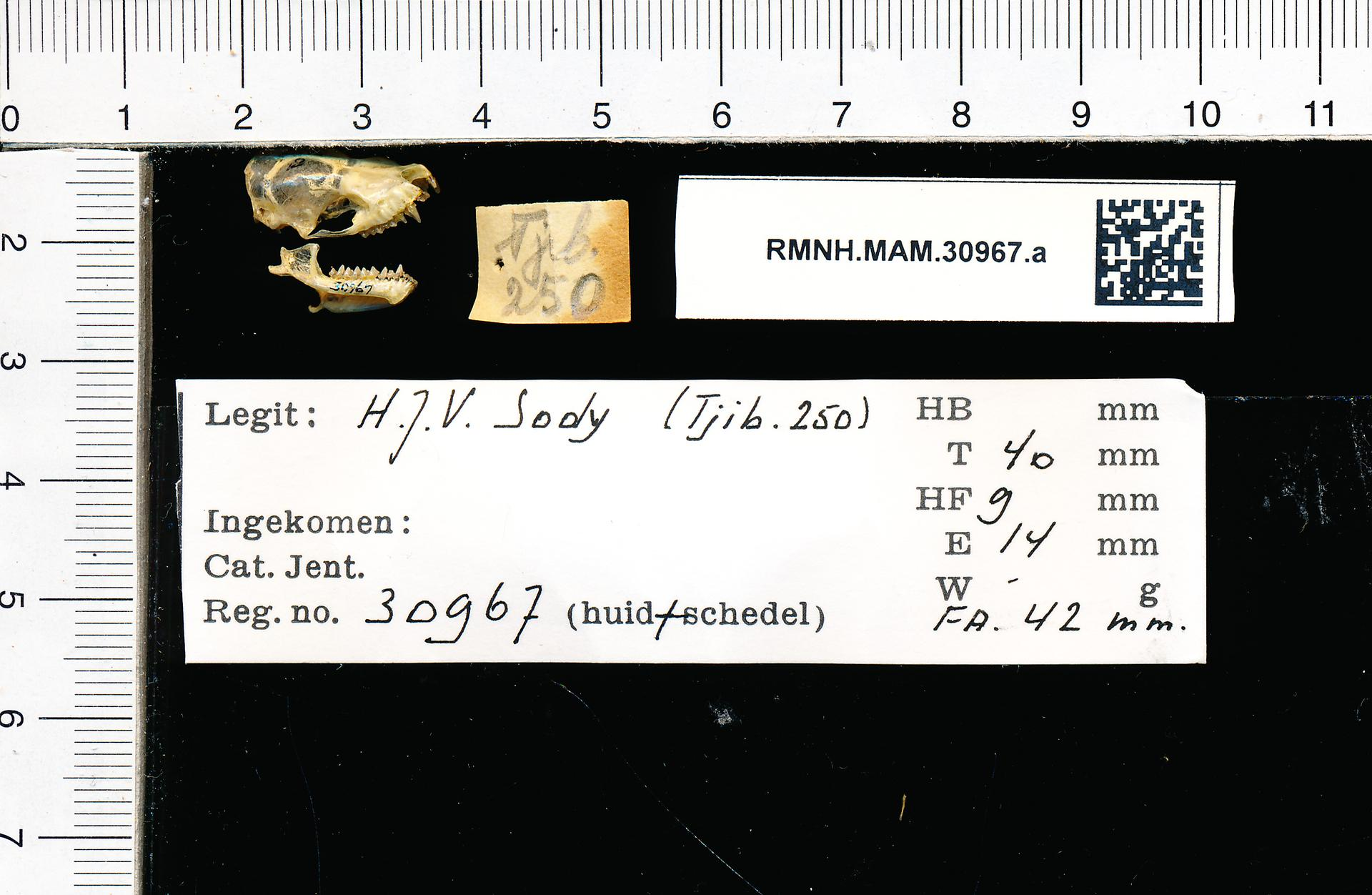
Falsistrellus mordax

Falsistrellus is a genus of vespertilionid family of bats, small predatory flying mammals. They are known from Australia. The poorly researched species have been variously placed by authors, and revised again by studies of their distinct characteristics, consequently the falsistrelles may also be referred to as pipistrelles or false pipstrelles.

== Taxonomy ==
Common names for the species include falsistrelle and false pipistrelle. The description of the genus was published in 1943 by Ellis Le Geyt Troughton. Some authorities maintain the earlier treatment of taxa as genus Pipistrellus, while other maintain this as a separate group. One revision of the genus Pipistrellus resurrected Troughton's genus to accommodate the south-eastern Australian Falsistrellus tasmaniensis and elevated the south-western Australian population as a new species, Falsistrellus mackenziei. The type species of the genus is Vespertilio tasmaniensis, described by John Gould in 1858, thus the combinations as Pipistrellus tasmaniensis and F. tasmaniensis.

The species outside of Australia have been supposed to be conspecific, and those endemic to the continent separated by a variety of taxonomic treatments. The limited morphological or morphometric analyses lent support to some arrangements, yet remained inconclusive in their implications to ranks of genus and species of associated taxa. The phylogenetic study of Falsistrellus petersi and Nyctalus plancyi in 2012, then later work on vespertilionid taxa of the region, had implications for the inclusion of Indomalayan species, the affinis group, in genus Falsistrellus and a phylogenetic reconstruction (2018) sees them assigned to genus Hypsugo.

== Species ==
As workers began to outline the diversity of vespertilionids during twentieth century several taxa were allied as the affinis group (Tate, 1942. et al.), currently named as Falsistrellus affinis, F. petersi and the inclusion or omission of species F. mordax. The Australian taxa were named for the type as a tasmaniensis group, which came to include the western population as F. mackenziei.

The ASM MammalDiversity Database recognizes two species:

- genus Falsistrellus
- Eastern false pipistrelle or eastern falsistrelle, Falsistrellus tasmaniensis An Australian endemic, named for Tasmania and found elsewhere
- Western false pipistrelle or western falsistrelle, Falsistrellus mackenziei. This western group is also considered as Falsistrellus tasmaniensis, in treatments combining the remote populations as one species.
