= Eastern false pipistrelle =

Conservation status
- Vulnerable (IUCN 3.1)

Scientific classification
- Kingdom: Animalia
- Phylum: Chordata
- Class: Mammalia
- Order: Chiroptera
- Family: Vespertilionidae
- Genus: Falsistrellus
- Species: F. tasmaniensis

Binomial name
- Falsistrellus tasmaniensis (Gould, 1858)

Synonyms
- Pipistrellus tasmaniensis (Gould, 1858)

Species of bat

The eastern false pipistrelle (Falsistrellus tasmaniensis) is a vesper bat that occurs in eastern and south-eastern Australia, including the island of Tasmania.

== Taxonomy ==
A species of genus Falsistrellus, allied to the family Vespertilionidae. The bats are distinguished from a western species, Falsistrellus mackenziei, by the common names eastern false pipistrelle and eastern falsistrelle. The first description was published by John Gould in his third volume of Mammals of Australia, issued in 1858. It is the type species for the genus Falsistrellus.

== Description ==
A falsistrelle bat—resembling the species Falsistrellus mackenziei—with brownish fur over the back, dark or reddish, and a lighter greyish colour at the front. The length of the forearm is 45–56 mm (1.8–2.2 in). The weight may range from 17–28 g (0.60–0.99 oz). The ear is prominent from the fur, and characteristic notches are seen at the outer margin of each lobe. The ear notch readily distinguishes it from a similar bat that occurs in the range, species Scoteanax rueppellii (greater broad-nosed bat, Rüppell's broad-nosed bat).
