= Dusky pipistrelle =

Conservation status
- Least Concern (IUCN 3.1)

Scientific classification
- Domain: Eukaryota
- Kingdom: Animalia
- Phylum: Chordata
- Class: Mammalia
- Order: Chiroptera
- Family: Vespertilionidae
- Genus: Pipistrellus
- Species: P. hesperidus

Binomial name
- Pipistrellus hesperidus (Temminck, 1840)

Species of bat

The dusky pipistrelle (Pipistrellus hesperidus) is a small pipistrelle bat found in Madagascar.
