= Peters's pipistrelle =

Conservation status
- Data Deficient (IUCN 3.1)

Scientific classification
- Domain: Eukaryota
- Kingdom: Animalia
- Phylum: Chordata
- Class: Mammalia
- Order: Chiroptera
- Family: Vespertilionidae
- Genus: Hypsugo
- Species: H. petersi

Binomial name
- Hypsugo petersi (Meyer, 1899)
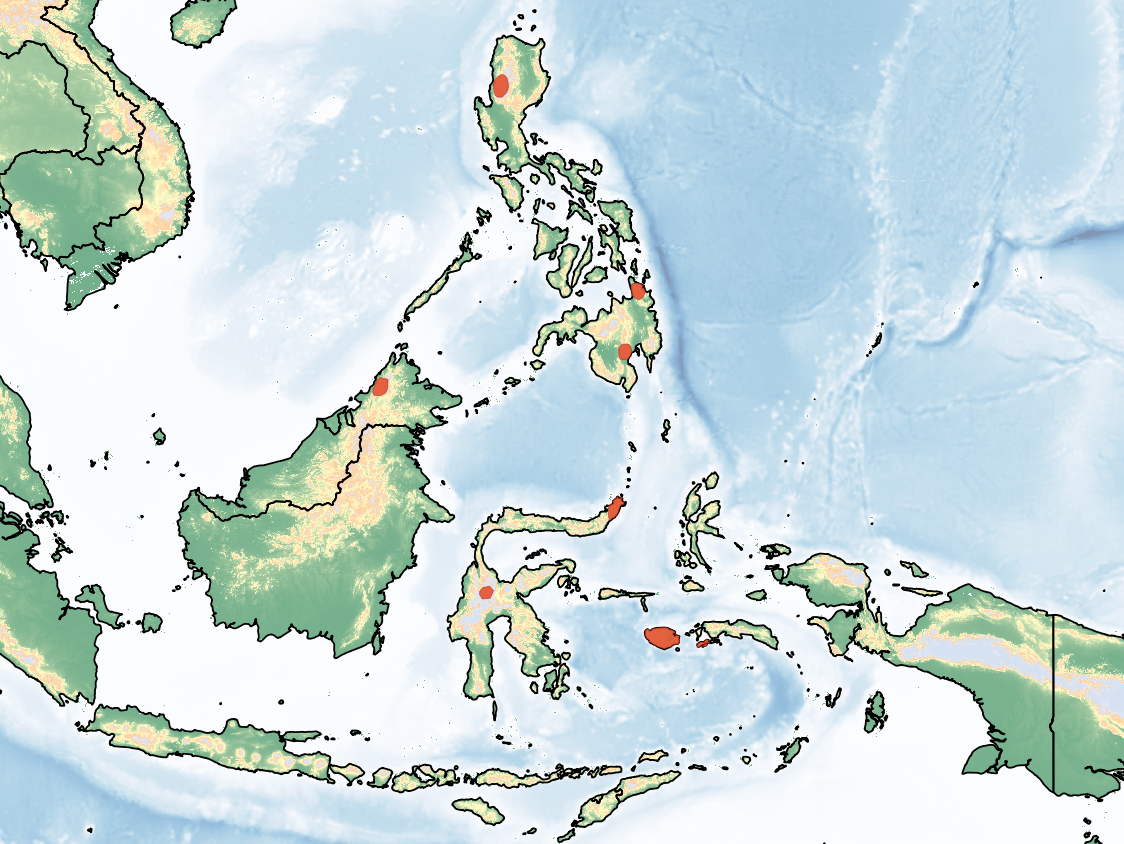

Synonyms
- Pipistrellus petersi (Meyer, 1899); Falsistrellus petersi

Species of bat

The Peters's pipistrelle (Hypsugo petersi) is a species of vesper bat in the family Vespertilionidae. It is found in Indonesia, Malaysia, and the Philippines.

Formerly classified in the genus Falsistrellus, phylogenetic evidence supports it belonging to the genus Hypsugo.
