= Red-brown pipistrelle =

Conservation status
- Data Deficient (IUCN 3.1)

Scientific classification
- Kingdom: Animalia
- Phylum: Chordata
- Class: Mammalia
- Order: Chiroptera
- Family: Vespertilionidae
- Genus: Hypsugo
- Species: H. kitcheneri

Binomial name
- Hypsugo kitcheneri (Thomas, 1915)
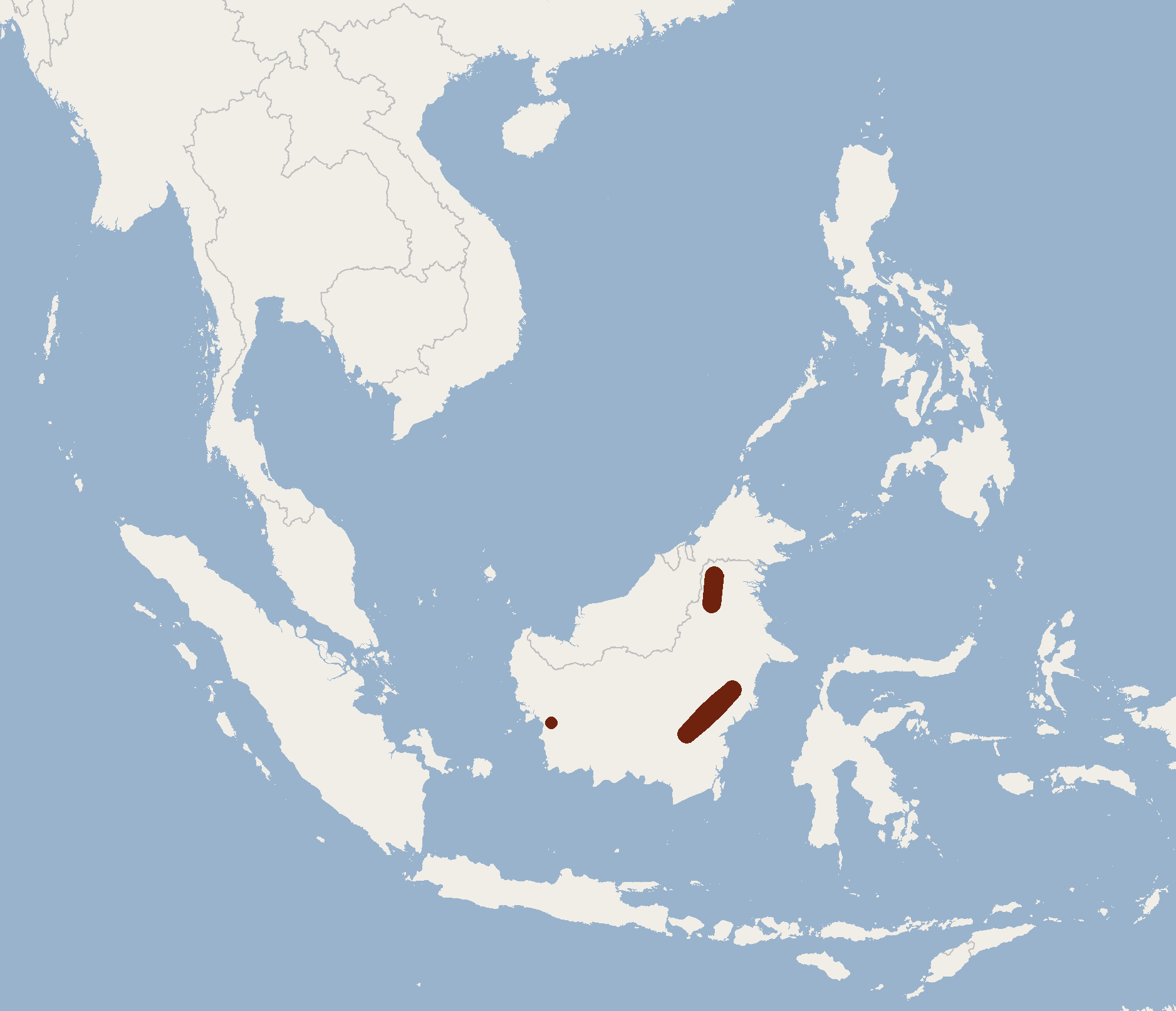

Synonyms
- Pipistrellus kitcheneri Thomas, 1915

Species of bat

The red-brown pipistrelle (Hypsugo kitcheneri) is a species of vesper bat in the family Vespertilionidae. It is found in Indonesia and possibly Malaysia.
