= Mount Gargues pipistrelle =

Conservation status
- Data Deficient (IUCN 3.1)

Scientific classification
- Kingdom: Animalia
- Phylum: Chordata
- Class: Mammalia
- Order: Chiroptera
- Family: Vespertilionidae
- Genus: Pipistrellus
- Species: P. aero

Binomial name
- Pipistrellus aero Heller, 1912

Species of bat

The Mount Gargues pipistrelle (Pipistrellus aero) is a species of vesper bat found in Kenya and believed to be widely distributed across highlands in Ethiopia. It typically lives in subtropical or tropical forests.
