= Suncus honeyi =

Suncus honeyi Temporal range: Late Miocene

Scientific classification
- Kingdom: Animalia
- Phylum: Chordata
- Class: Mammalia
- Order: Eulipotyphla
- Family: Soricidae
- Genus: Suncus
- Species: †S. honeyi

Binomial name
- †Suncus honeyi Flynn et al., 2020

Extinct species of shrew

Suncus honeyi is an extinct species of Suncus that lived Late Miocene(Tortonian) of Indian subcontinent.

== Distribution ==
Suncus honeyi fossils are known from the Dhok Pathan Formation of Pakistan and Sandhan Formation of Kutch district, India.
