= Aellen's pipistrelle =

Conservation status
- Data Deficient (IUCN 3.1)

Scientific classification
- Kingdom: Animalia
- Phylum: Chordata
- Class: Mammalia
- Order: Chiroptera
- Family: Vespertilionidae
- Genus: Pipistrellus
- Species: P. inexspectatus

Binomial name
- Pipistrellus inexspectatus Aellen, 1959

Species of bat

Aellen's pipistrelle (Pipistrellus inexspectatus) is a species of vesper bat. It can be found in possibly Benin, Cameroon, Ghana, Nigeria, and Sierra Leone. It is found in dry and moist savanna.

== Taxonomy and etymology ==
It was described as a new species in 1959 by V. Aellen. The species name "inexspectatus" is sometimes spelled as "inexpectatus", but this is incorrect. "Inexspectatus" is Latin for "unexpected".

== Description ==
It is a very small species of bat, with a forearm length of 31–33 mm (1.2–1.3 in). It weighs only 3–4 g (0.11–0.14 oz). Its ears are short, at 10–13 mm (0.39–0.51 in) long. Its dorsal fur is dark brown, with individual hairs bicolored. Hairs are consistently colored on its ventral side. Its wing membranes are also dark brown; the posterior margins of the wings are whitish. The uropatagium is paler than the wing membranes. Its calcar is keeled, though almost imperceptibly. Its dental formula is 2.1.2.33.1.2.3, for a total of 34 teeth.

== Range and habitat ==
It is known from the Guinean forest-savanna mosaic in Sierra Leone, Ghana, Benin, Nigeria, and Cameroon.

== Conservation ==
Aellen's pipistrelle is currently evaluated as data deficient by the IUCN because there is not enough information available to make an accurate conservation assessment.
