= Pipistrellus etula =

Scientific classification
- Kingdom: Animalia
- Phylum: Chordata
- Class: Mammalia
- Order: Chiroptera
- Family: Vespertilionidae
- Genus: Pipistrellus
- Species: P. etula

Binomial name
- Pipistrellus etula Torrent et al., 2025

Species of bat

Pipistrellus etula, also known as Bioko pipistrelle, is a species of vesper bat endemic to Bioko Island in Equatorial Guinea. Its discovery in 2025 marked the 1,500th bat species recognized worldwide.

== Etymology ==
The specific epithet "etula" honors the indigenous Bubi people of the island; in the Bantu language of the Bubi, "etula" means "island" or "god of the island."

== Distribution and habitat ==
The species is currently known only from the montane forests of Bioko Island, Equatorial Guinea. It was captured during biodiversity assessments at elevations above 1,000 metres (3,280 ft). Researchers suspect it may also occur in other highland areas along the Cameroon Volcanic Line.

== See also ==
- List of living mammal species described in the 2020s
