= Eisentraut's serotine =

Conservation status
- Data Deficient (IUCN 3.1)

Scientific classification
- Kingdom: Animalia
- Phylum: Chordata
- Class: Mammalia
- Order: Chiroptera
- Family: Vespertilionidae
- Genus: Nycticeinops
- Species: N. eisentrauti

Binomial name
- Nycticeinops eisentrauti (Hill, 1968)

Synonyms
- Hypsugo eisentrauti Pipistrellus eisentrauti Hill, 1968; Parahypsugo eisentrauti Hutterer, Decher, Monadjem, and Astrin, 2019

Species of bat

Eisentraut's serotine (Nycticeinops eisentrauti), formerly known as Eisentraut's pipistrelle, is a species of vesper bat in the family Vespertilionidae. It is found in Cameroon, Democratic Republic of the Congo, Kenya, Somalia, and Uganda. Its natural habitats are subtropical or tropical forests.
