= Nycticeinops kutchensis =

Nycticeinops kutchensis Temporal range: Late Miocene, Tortonian ~11–10 Ma

Scientific classification
- Kingdom: Animalia
- Phylum: Chordata
- Class: Mammalia
- Order: Chiroptera
- Family: Vespertilionidae
- Genus: Nycticeinops
- Species: †N. kutchensis

Binomial name
- †Nycticeinops kutchensis Carolin et al., 2026

Extinct species of bat in the genus Nycticeinops

Nycticeinops kutchensis is an extinct species of vespertilionid bat in the genus Nycticeinops that lived in the Indian Subcontinent during the Tortonian stage of the Miocene epoch.

== Discovery and Naming ==
The holotype specimen of Nycticeinops kutchensis is IITR/VPL/SBNM:12, an isolated m2 tooth that was discovered in Kutch district of Gujarat, India.

The specific epithet of the species refers to Kutch district in the state of Gujarat because the fossilised holotype was found there.

== Evolution ==
Nycticeinops kutchensis is believed to be the oldest known record of the genus Nycticeinops and the tribe hypsugine, which suggests that hypsugine bats originated in Indian subcontinent, it also represent a member of a radiation of vespertilionine bats that diversified during the Middle Miocene Climatic Optimum.
