= Arabian pipistrelle =

Conservation status
- Data Deficient (IUCN 3.1)

Scientific classification
- Kingdom: Animalia
- Phylum: Chordata
- Class: Mammalia
- Order: Chiroptera
- Family: Vespertilionidae
- Genus: Hypsugo
- Species: H. arabicus

Binomial name
- Hypsugo arabicus Harrison, 1979
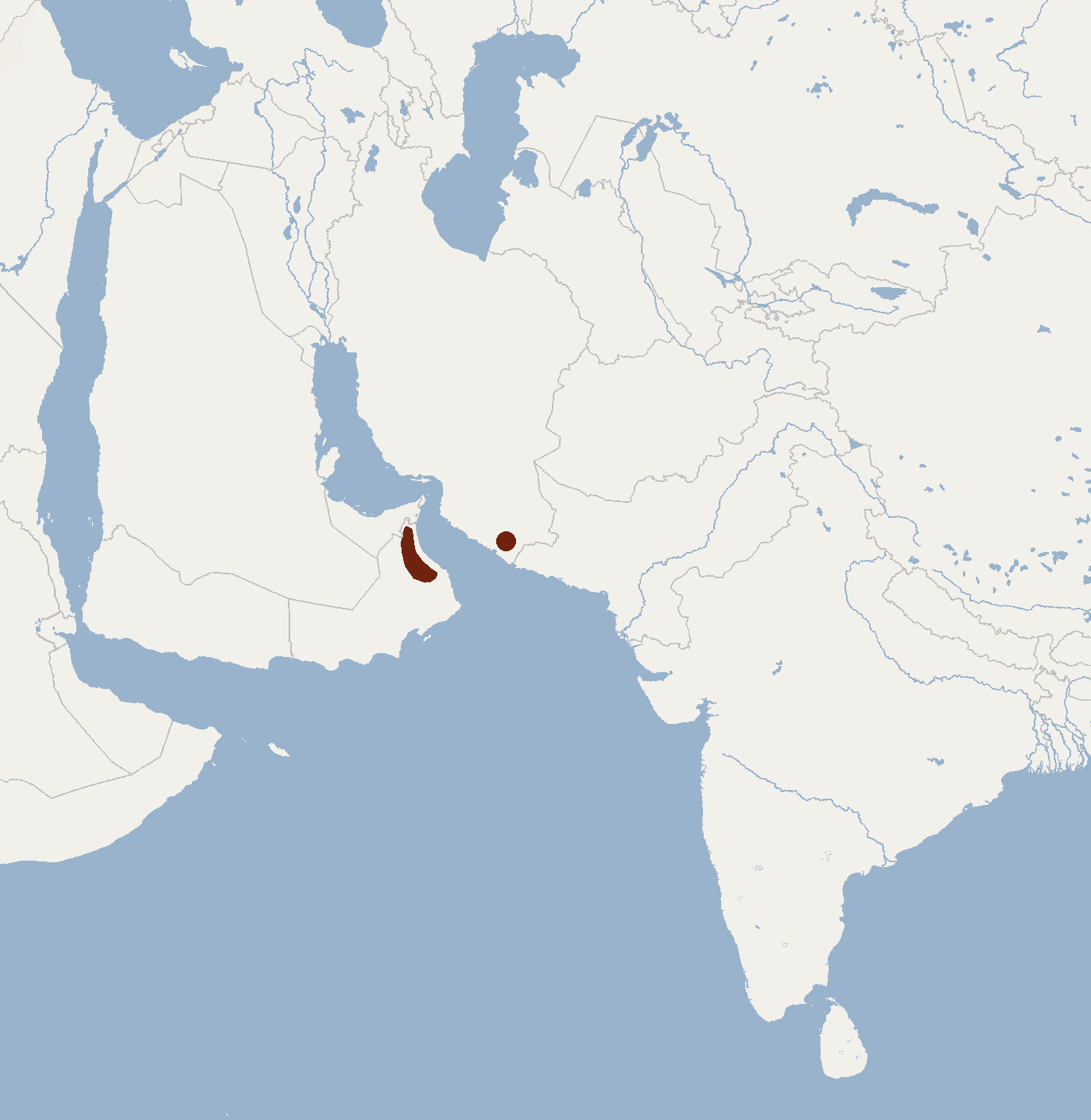

Synonyms
- Pipistrellus arabicus Harrison, 1979

Species of bat

The Arabian pipistrelle (Hypsugo arabicus) is a species of vesper bat in the family Vespertilionidae. It is found only in Iran and Oman.

== Taxonomy and etymology ==
It was described as a new species in 1979 by David L. Harrison. Its species name "arabicus" is Latin for "Arabic".

== Description ==
It is a small species of bat with a total length of 66.7 mm (2.63 in) and a forearm length of 29 mm (1.1 in). Harrison described it as "one of the smallest Arabian bats."

== Biology and ecology ==
It is insectivorous, consuming Auchenorrhynchans, beetles, and hymenopterans.

== Range and habitat ==
The species is found in the Arabian Peninsula and Western Asia. It was first documented in Oman. A 2002 study noted that the species had been documented in Iran.

== Conservation ==
As of 2019, it is evaluated as data deficient by the IUCN. Its population size and trends are unknown. While its extent of occurrence—spanning Iran to Oman—is relatively large, it is possible that its area of occurrence could be much smaller. In 1996, it had been categorized as vulnerable.
