= Broad-headed serotine =

Conservation status
- Least Concern (IUCN 3.1)

Scientific classification
- Domain: Eukaryota
- Kingdom: Animalia
- Phylum: Chordata
- Class: Mammalia
- Order: Chiroptera
- Family: Vespertilionidae
- Genus: Nycticeinops
- Species: N. crassulus

Binomial name
- Nycticeinops crassulus (Thomas, 1904)

Synonyms
- Pipistrellus crassulus Thomas, 1904; Hypsugo crassulus Parahypsugo crassulus Hutterer, Decher, Monadjem, and Astrin, 2019

Species of bat

The broad-headed serotine (Nycticeinops crassulus), formerly known as the broad-headed pipistrelle, is a species of vesper bat in the family Vespertilionidae. It is found in Angola, Cameroon, Republic of the Congo, Democratic Republic of the Congo, Ivory Coast, Guinea, liberia, Kenya, South Sudan, and Uganda. Its natural habitats are subtropical and tropical forests.
