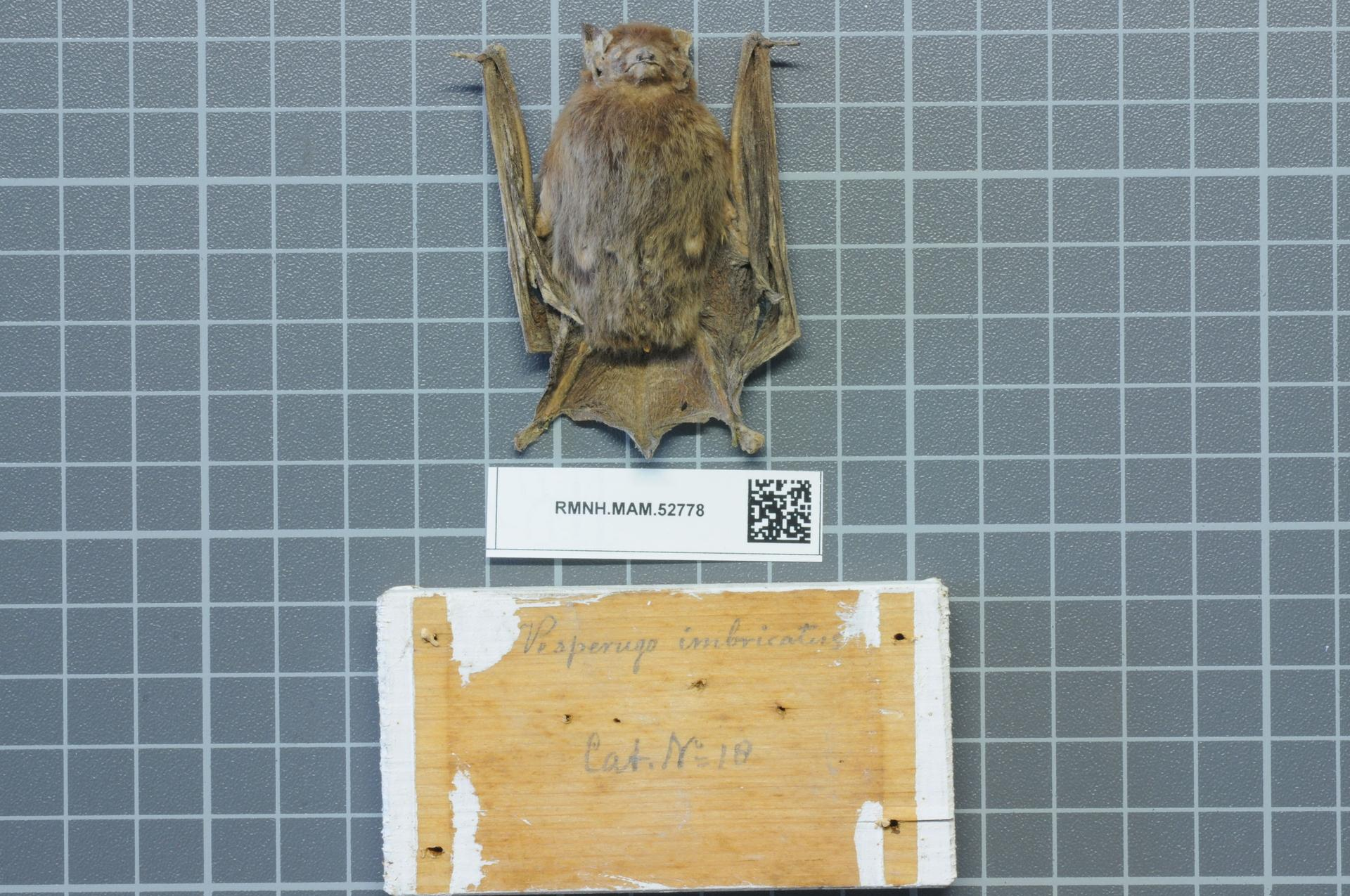

Conservation status
- Least Concern (IUCN 3.1)

Scientific classification
- Kingdom: Animalia
- Phylum: Chordata
- Class: Mammalia
- Order: Chiroptera
- Family: Vespertilionidae
- Genus: Hypsugo
- Species: H. imbricatus

Binomial name
- Hypsugo imbricatus (Horsfield, 1824)

Synonyms
- Pipistrellus imbricatus (Horsfield, 1824)

= Brown pipistrelle =

Species of bat

The brown pipistrelle (Hypsugo imbricatus) is a species of vesper bat in the family Vespertilionidae. It is found in Indonesia and Malaysia.
