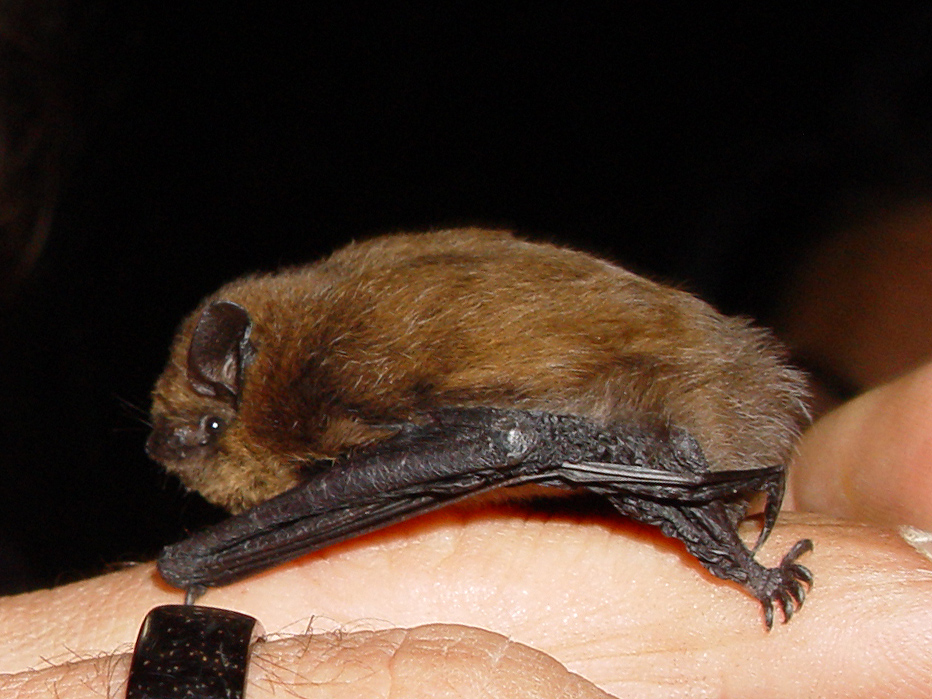
- Common pipistrelle (Pipistrellus pipistrellus)

Scientific classification
- Kingdom: Animalia
- Phylum: Chordata
- Class: Mammalia
- Infraclass: Placentalia
- Order: Chiroptera
- Family: Vespertilionidae
- Subfamily: Vespertilioninae
- Tribe: Pipistrellini
- Genus: Pipistrellus; Kaup, 1829

Type species
- Vespertilio pipistrellus Schreber, 1774

Species
- See text

= Pipistrellus =

Genus of bats

Pipistrellus is a genus of bats in the family Vespertilionidae and subfamily Vespertilioninae. The name of the genus is derived from the Italian word pipistrello, meaning "bat" (from Latin vespertilio "bird of evening, bat").

The size of the genus has been considerably reduced as a result of work during the 1990s and 2000s, with genera such as Arielulus, Hypsugo, Falsistrellus, Neoromicia, Parastrellus, Perimyotis, Scotozous, and Vespadelus being split off. Still, molecular evidence suggests the genus is not monophyletic. Several other genera in the subfamily Vespertilioninae have also been merged with Pipistrellus in previous classifications. Species in the genus may be referred to as "pipistrelles" or "pipistrelle bats", though these terms are also used for species now placed in other genera, such as the western pipistrelle (Parastrellus hesperus) and eastern pipistrelle (Perimyotis subflavus) of North America. Species of the Southern Hemisphere separated to genus Falsistrellus are sometimes referred to as false pipistrelle or falsistrelle.

They are somewhat distinguished from their much larger relatives, the noctule bats Nyctalus by their weak, fluttery flight reminiscent of a butterfly, though a few species are more direct in their flight.

A 2025 study resulted in many species being separated into the genus Alionoctula.

== Species ==
According to the Mammal Diversity Database:

- Mount Gargues pipistrelle, P. aero
- Crete pipistrelle, P. creticus
- Bioko pipistrelle, P. etula
- Hanak's dwarf bat, P. hanaki
- Dusky pipistrelle, P. hesperidus
- Aellen's pipistrelle, P. inexspectatus
- Kuhl's pipistrelle, P. kuhlii
- Madeira pipistrelle, P. maderensis
- Tiny pipistrelle, P. nanulus
- Nathusius's pipistrelle, P. nathusii
- Dar es Salaam pipistrelle, P. permixtus
- Common pipistrelle, P. pipistrellus
- Soprano pipistrelle, P. pygmaeus
- Racey's pipistrelle, P. raceyi
- Rusty pipistrelle, P. rusticus
- Simandou pipistrelle, P. simandouensis
