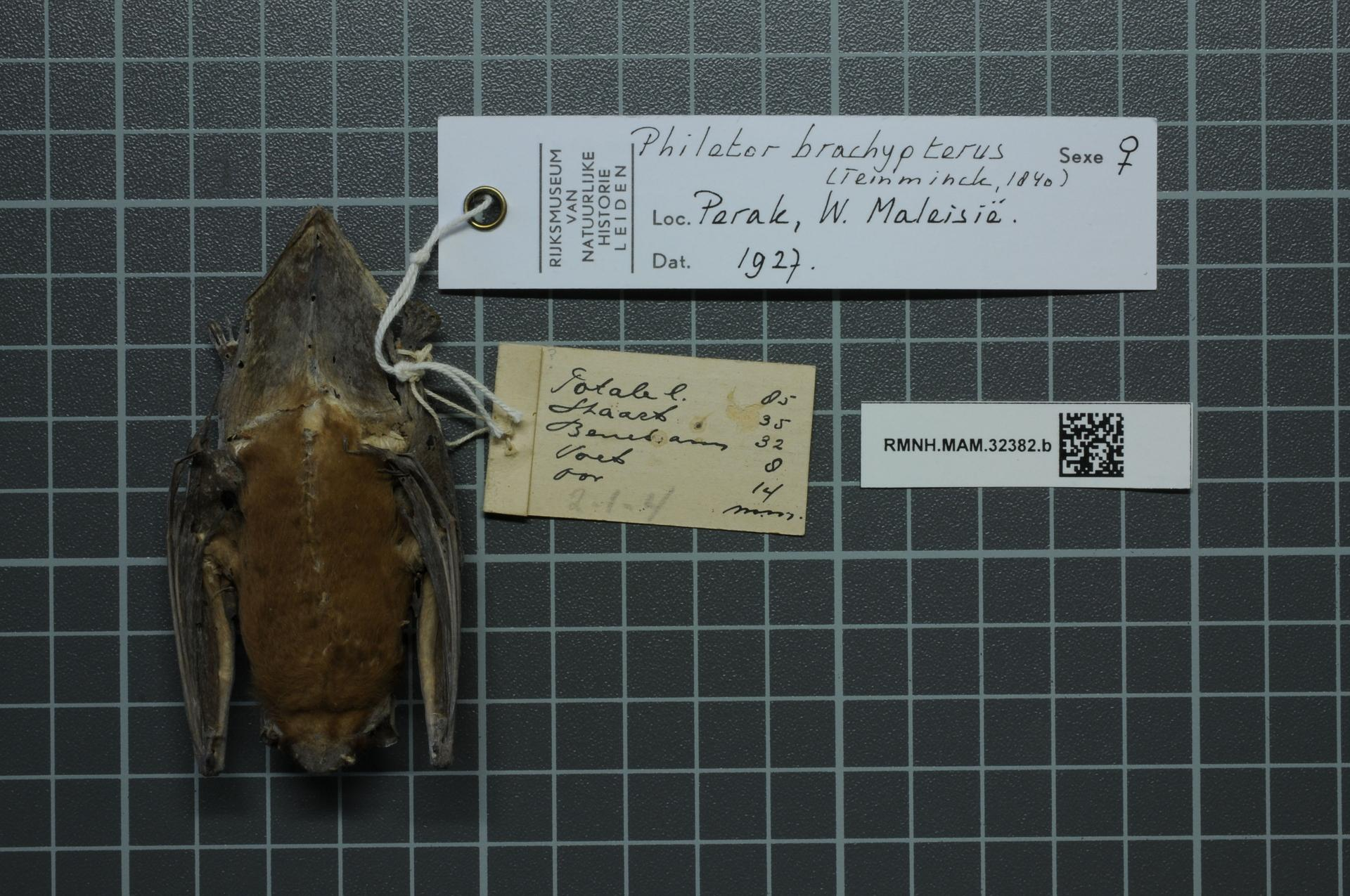

Conservation status
- Least Concern (IUCN 3.1)

Scientific classification
- Kingdom: Animalia
- Phylum: Chordata
- Class: Mammalia
- Order: Chiroptera
- Family: Vespertilionidae
- Genus: Philetor; Thomas, 1902
- Species: P. brachypterus

Binomial name
- Philetor brachypterus (Temminck, 1840)
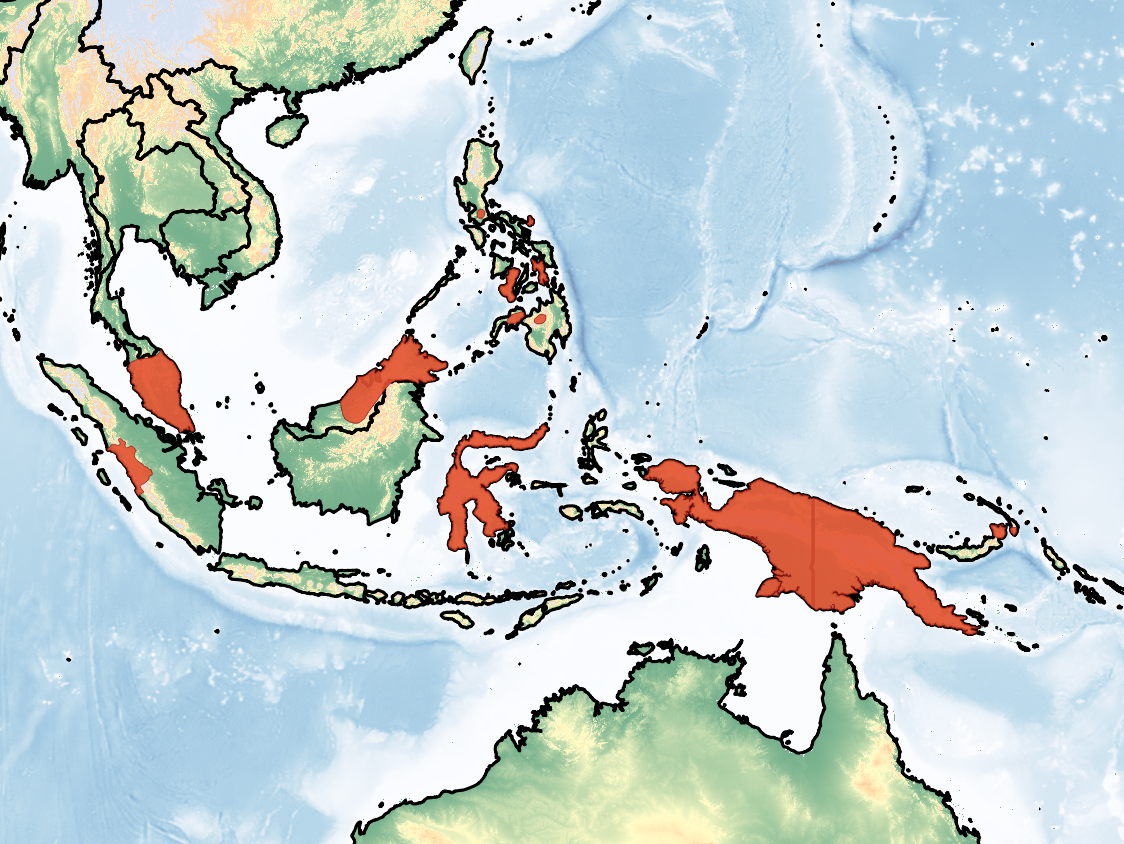

= Rohu's bat =

Species of vesper bat

Rohu's bat (Philetor brachypterus) is a species of vesper bat. It is the only species in the genus Philetor. It is found in Brunei, Indonesia, Malaysia, Nepal, Papua New Guinea, and the Philippines.
